= Maccabees =

Group of Jewish rebels in the Seleucid Empire

The descendants of Mattathias

The Maccabees (/ˈmækəbiːz/), also spelled Machabees (Hebrew: מַכַּבִּים, romanized: Makkabbīm, or מַקַבִּים, Maqabbīm; Latin: Machabaei or Maccabaei; Ancient Greek: Μακκαβαῖοι, romanized: Makkabaioi), were a group of Jewish rebel warriors who re-took control of Judea, which at the time was occupied by the Seleucid Empire. Its leaders, the Hasmoneans, founded the Hasmonean dynasty, which ruled from 167 BC (after the Maccabean Revolt) to 37 BC, being a fully independent kingdom from 104 to 63 BC. They reasserted the Jewish religion, ended the Syrian-Greek occupation of Judea, and reduced the influence of Hellenism and Hellenistic Judaism.

== Etymology ==
The name "Maccabee" is often used as a synonym for the entire Hasmonean dynasty. But the Maccabees often and more narrowly refers to Judas Maccabeus and his four brothers. The name Maccabee was a personal epithet of Judah, and the later generations were not his direct descendants. One explanation of the name's origins is that it derives from the Aramaic maqqəḇa, "the hammer", in recognition of Judah's ferocity in battle. The traditional Jewish explanation is that Maccabee (Hebrew: מכבים Makkabi) is an acronym for the Torah verse that was the battle-cry of the Maccabees, "Mi kamocha ba'elim YHWH", "Who is like You among the heavenly powers, oh God!", as well as an acronym for "Matityahu haKohen ben Yochanan" (Matthias the priest, son of John). The correlating Torah verse Exodus 15:11, The song of Moses and the Children of Israel by the Sea, makes a reference to elim, with a mundane notion of natural forces, heavenly might, war and governmental powers. The scholar and poet Aaron Kaminka argues that the name is a corruption of Machbanai, a mighty warrior in the army of King David.

== Background ==
In the 2nd century BC, Judea lay between the Ptolemaic Kingdom (based in Egypt) and the Seleucid Empire (based in Syria), monarchies which had formed following the death of Alexander the Great. Judea had initially come under Ptolemaic rule but fell to the Seleucids around 197 BC, after the Battle of Panium, during the Fifth Syrian War. Judea at that time had been affected by the Hellenization initiated by Alexander the Great. Some Jews, mainly those of the urban upper class, notably the Tobiad family, wished to dispense with Jewish law and to adopt a Greek lifestyle. According to historian Victor Tcherikover, the main motive for the Tobiads' Hellenism was economic and political. The Hellenizing Jews built a gymnasium in Jerusalem, competed in international Greek games, "removed their marks of circumcision and repudiated the holy covenant".

When Antiochus IV Epiphanes became ruler of the Seleucid Empire in 175 BC, Onias III held the office of high priest in Jerusalem. To Antiochus, the high priest was merely a local governor within his realm, a man whom he could appoint or dismiss at will, while orthodox Jews saw the holder of the high priesthood as divinely appointed. Jason, the brother of Onias, bribed Antiochus to make him high priest instead of Onias. Jason abolished the traditional theocracy and "received from Antiochus permission to convert Jerusalem into a Greek polis called Antioch". In turn, Menelaus then bribed Antiochus and was appointed high priest in place of Jason. Menelaus had Onias assassinated. Menelaus' brother Lysimachus stole holy vessels from the Temple; the resulting riots led to the death of Lysimachus. Menelaus was arrested for Onias' murder and was arraigned before Antiochus, but he bribed his way out of trouble. Jason subsequently drove out Menelaus and became high priest again. In 168 BCE, Antiochus pillaged the Temple, attacked Jerusalem and "led captive the women and children." From this point onwards, Antiochus pursued a zealous Hellenizing policy in the Seleucid satrapies of Coele Syria and Phoenicia.

Now Antiochus was not satisfied either with his unexpected taking the city (Jerusalem), or with its pillage, or with the great slaughter he had made there; but being overcome with his violent passions, and remembering what he had suffered during the siege, he compelled the Jews to dissolve the laws of their country, and to keep their infants uncircumcised, and to sacrifice swine's flesh upon the altar; against which they all opposed themselves, and the most approved among them were put to death. —Flavius Josephus, The War of the Jews, Book 1.1 §2

The author of the First Book of Maccabees regards the Maccabean revolt as a rising of pious Jews against the Seleucid king (who had tried to eradicate their religion) and against the Jews who supported him. The author of the Second Book of Maccabees presents the conflict as a struggle between "Judaism" and "Hellenism", concepts which he coined. Most modern scholars argue that King Antiochus reacted to a civil war between traditionalist Jews in the Judean countryside and Hellenized Jews in Jerusalem, though the king's response of persecuting the religious traditionalists was unusual in antiquity, and was the immediate provocation for the revolt. According to Joseph P. Schultz, modern scholarship "considers the Maccabean revolt less as an uprising against foreign oppression than as a civil war between the orthodox and reformist parties in the Jewish camp", but John J. Collins writes that while the civil war between Jewish leaders led to the king's new policies, it is wrong to see the revolt as simply a conflict between Hellenism and Judaism, since "[t]he revolt was not provoked by the introduction of Greek customs (typified by the building of a gymnasium) but by the persecution of people who observed the Torah by having their children circumcised and refusing to eat pork."

In the conflict over the office of high priest, traditionalists with Hebrew/Aramaic names like Onias contested with Hellenizers with Greek names like Jason and Menelaus. Some scholars point to social and economic factors in the conflict. What began as a civil war took on the character of an invasion when the Hellenistic kingdom of Syria sided with the Hellenizing Jews against the traditionalists. As the conflict escalated, Antiochus prohibited the practices of the traditionalists, thereby, in a departure from usual Seleucid practice, banning the religion of an entire people. The motives of Antiochus remain unclear: he may have been incensed at the overthrow of his appointee, Menelaus, or – encouraged by a group of radical Hellenizers among the Jews, he may have been responding to an orthodox Jewish revolt that drew on the Temple and the Torah for its strength. Other scholars argue that, while the rising began as a religious rebellion, it was gradually transformed into a war of national liberation.

According to 1 Maccabees, Antiochus banned many traditional Jewish and Samaritan religious practices: he made possession of the Torah a capital offense and burned the copies he could find; sabbaths and feasts were banned; circumcision was outlawed, and mothers who circumcised their babies were killed along with their families; and traditional Jewish ritual sacrifice was forbidden. It was said that an idol of Olympian Zeus was placed on the altar of the Temple and that Israelites set up altars to Greek gods and sacrificed "unclean" animals on them.

The main objective of Antiochus is explained throughout Chassidic thought. It says that Antiochus didn't mind that the Jews kept the culture of Judaism, rather all he wanted was to eradicate the laws of the Torah (mitzvos) that weren't logical but rather kept solely because it is God's command. But when he saw that even the logical/rational and cultural commandments of the Torah were being practiced by the Jews in a way higher than logic, he then opposed Judaism in its entirety.

== Revolt ==
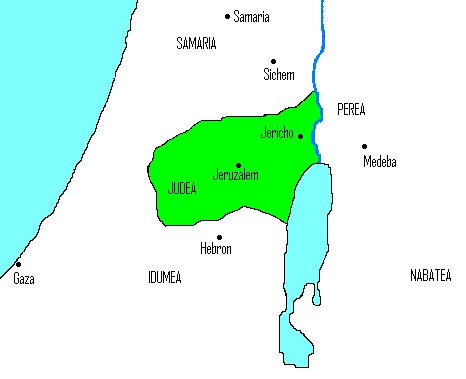
Judea under Judah Maccabee

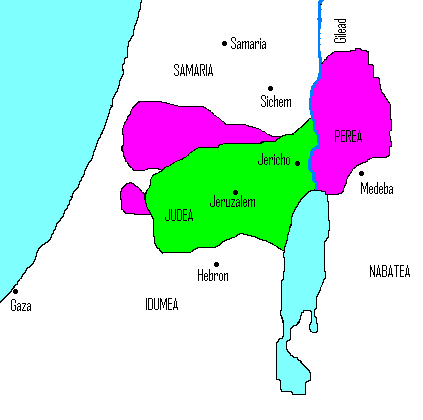
Jonathan's conquests

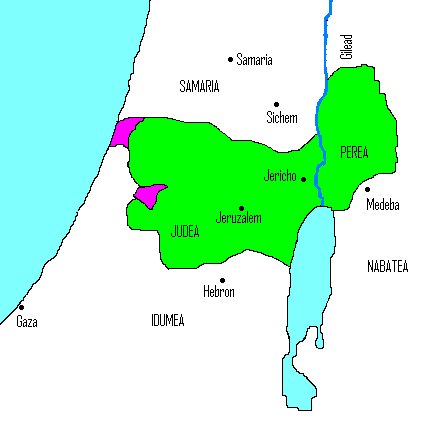
Simon's conquests

In the narrative of I Maccabees, after Antiochus issued his decrees forbidding Jewish religious practice, a rural Jewish priest from Modi'in, Mattathias the Hasmonean, sparked the revolt against the Seleucid Empire by refusing to worship the Greek gods. Mattathias killed a Hellenistic Jew who stepped forward to offer a sacrifice to an idol in Mattathias' place. He and his five sons fled to the wilderness of Judah. After Mattathias' death about one year later in 166 BCE, his son Judah Maccabee led an army of Jewish dissidents to victory over the Seleucids in guerrilla warfare, which at first was directed against Hellenizing Jews, of whom there were many. The Maccabees destroyed pagan altars in the villages, circumcised boys and forced Jews into outlawry. As a result, one explanation of the name Maccabees is based on the Aramaic word for "hammer", because they "strike hammer blows against their enemies".

The revolt involved many battles, in which the Maccabean forces gained notoriety among the Seleucid army for their use of guerrilla tactics. After the victory, the Maccabees entered Jerusalem in triumph and ritually cleansed the Temple, reestablishing traditional Jewish worship there and installing Jonathan Maccabee as high priest. A large Seleucid army was sent to quash the revolt but returned to Syria on the death of Antiochus IV. Its commander Lysias, preoccupied with internal Seleucid affairs, agreed to a political compromise that restored religious freedom.

The Jewish festival of Hanukkah celebrates the re-dedication of the Temple following Judah Maccabee's victory over the Seleucids. According to rabbinic tradition, the victorious Maccabees could only find a small jug of oil that had remained uncontaminated by virtue of a seal, and although it only contained enough oil to sustain the Temple menorah for one day, it miraculously lasted for eight days, by which time further oil could be procured.

== Hasmonean dynasty ==
Following the re-dedication of the Temple, the supporters of the Maccabees were divided over the question of whether to continue fighting. When the revolt began under the leadership of Mattathias, it was seen as a war for religious freedom to end oppression by the Seleucids. However, as the Maccabees realized how successful they had been, many wanted to continue the revolt and conquer other lands with Jewish populations. This policy exacerbated the divide between the Pharisees and Sadducees under later Hasmonean monarchs such as Alexander Jannaeus. Those who sought the continuation of the war were led by Judah Maccabee.

On his death in battle in 160 BCE, Judah was succeeded as army commander by his younger brother, Jonathan, who was already high priest. Jonathan made treaties with various foreign states, causing further dissent between those who merely desired religious freedom and those who sought greater power.

In 142 BCE, Jonathan was assassinated by Diodotus Tryphon, a pretender to the Seleucid throne, and was succeeded by Simon Maccabee, the last remaining son of Mattathias. Simon gave support to Demetrius II Nicator, the Seleucid king, and in return Demetrius exempted the Maccabees from tribute. Simon conquered the port of Joppa, where the Gentile population were 'forcibly removed', and the fortress of Gezer. He expelled the garrison from the Acra in Jerusalem. In 140 BCE, he was recognised by an assembly of the priests, leaders and elders as high priest, military commander and ruler of Israel. Their decree became the basis of the Hasmonean kingdom. Shortly after, the Roman Senate renewed its alliance with the Hasmonean kingdom and commanded its allies in the eastern Mediterranean to do so also. Although the Maccabees won autonomy, the region remained a province of the Seleucid Empire, and Simon was required to provide troops to Antiochus VII Sidetes, the brother of Demetrius II. When Simon refused to give up the territory he had conquered, Antiochus took them by force.

Simon was murdered in 134 BCE by his son-in-law Ptolemy and was succeeded as high priest and king by his son John Hyrcanus I. Antiochus conquered the entire district of Judea but refrained from attacking the Temple or interfering with Jewish observances. Judea was freed from Seleucid rule on the death of Antiochus in 129 BCE. Independent Hasmonean rule lasted until 63 BCE, when the Roman general Pompeius intervened in the Hasmonean civil war, making it a client kingdom of Rome. The Hasmonean dynasty ended in 37 BCE when the Idumean Herod the Great became king of Israel, designated "King of the Jews" by the Roman Senate, effectively transforming the Hasmonean kingdom into the Herodian kingdom—a client kingdom of Rome.

== Biblical accounts ==
The Maccabean story is preserved in the books of First and Second Maccabees, which describe in detail the re-dedication of the Temple in Jerusalem and the lighting of the menorah. These books are not part of the Tanakh (Hebrew Bible) which came from the Jewish canon; however, they were part of the Alexandrian canon which is also called the Septuagint. Both books are included in the Old Testament used by the Catholic and Orthodox churches, since those churches consider the books deuterocanonical. They are not included in the Old Testament books in most Protestant Bibles since most Protestants consider the books apocryphal.

Multiple references to Hanukkah are made in the Mishnah (Bikkurim 1:6, Rosh HaShanah 1:3, Taanit 2:10, Megillah 3:4 and 3:6, Moed Katan 3:9, and Bava Kama 6:6), though specific laws are not described. The miracle of the one-day supply of oil lasting eight days is first described in the Talmud, committed to writing about 600 years after the events described in the books of Maccabees. The New Testament mentions Jesus visiting the temple during Hanukkah (John 10:22-23).

== Christian veneration and possible Jewish preceding tradition ==
=== The nine "Holy Maccabean Martyrs" in Christianity ===
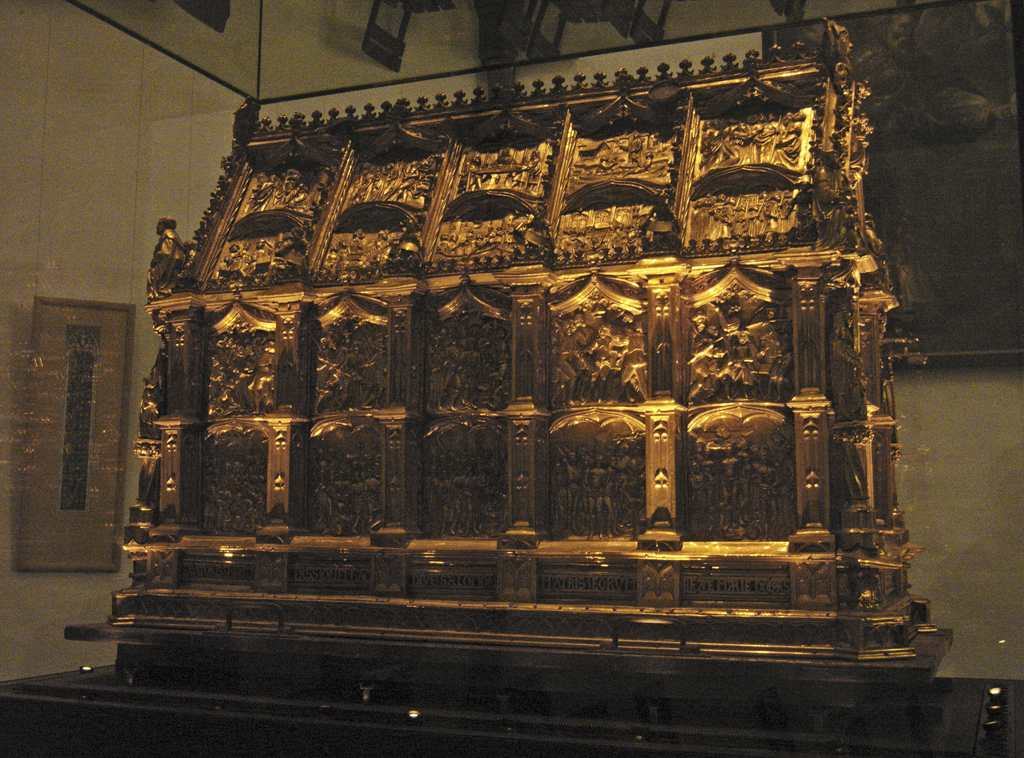
What are believed to be the Maccabees' relics – kept in the Maccabees Shrine – are venerated in St. Andrew's Church, Cologne, Germany.

The Holy Maccabees
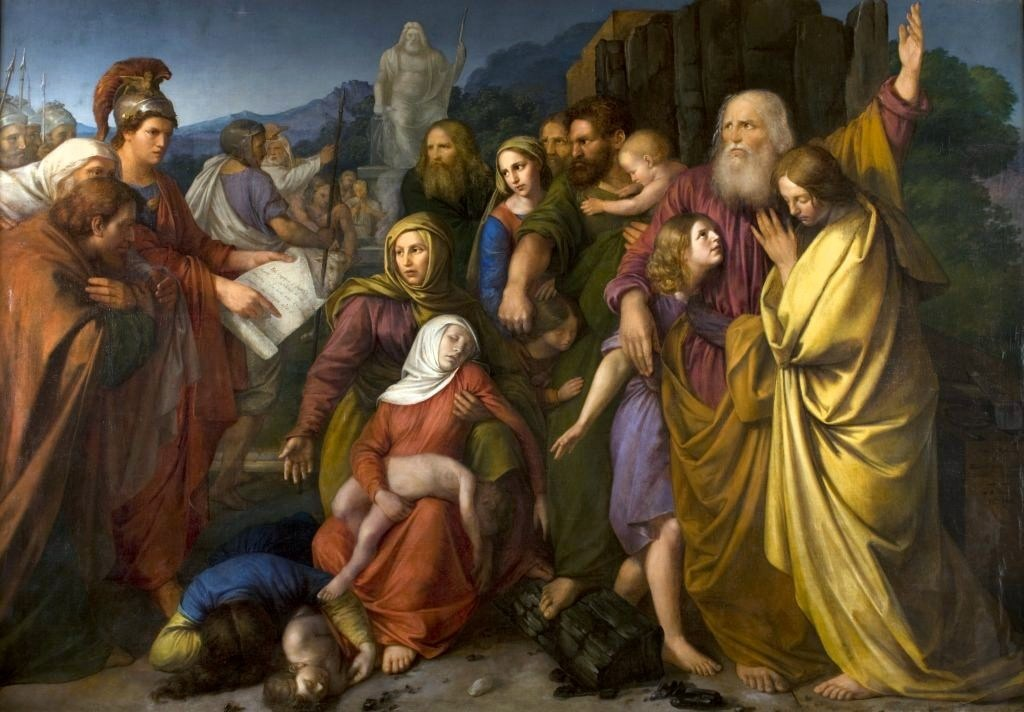
- Wojciech Stattler's "Machabeusze" ("The Maccabees"), 1844
- Born: 2nd century BCE; Judea (modern-day Israel)
- Died: 167–160 BCE; Judea
- Venerated in: Catholic Church; Eastern Orthodox Churches; Oriental Orthodox Churches
- Canonized: Pre-Congregation
- Feast: August 1

The second and fourth books of the Maccabees recount the martyrdom of seven Jewish brothers, their mother and their teacher. Although these are not said to be of the Maccabee family, they are referred to in Christianity as the "Holy Maccabean Martyrs" or the "Holy Maccabees." According to one tradition, their individual names are Habim, Antonin, Guriah, Eleazar, Eusebon, Hadim (Halim), Marcellus, their mother Solomonia, and their teacher Eleazar.

The three Ethiopian books of Meqabyan (quite distinct works from the other four books of Maccabees), which are canonical in the Ethiopian Orthodox Tewahedo Church, also refer to the Maccabee martyrs. The first of these books states that their father was a Benjamite named Maccabeus and that three of the brothers, who are called Abya, Seela, and Fentos, were captured and martyred for leading a guerrilla war against Antiochus Epiphanes.

From before the time of the Tridentine calendar, the Holy Maccabees had a commemoration in the Roman Rite liturgy within the feast of Saint Peter in Chains. This commemoration remained within the weekday liturgy when in 1960 Pope John XXIII suppressed this particular feast of Saint Peter. Nine years later, 1 August became the feast of Saint Alphonsus Maria de' Liguori, and the mention of the Maccabee martyrs was omitted from the General Roman Calendar, since in its 1969 revision it no longer admitted commemorations. The feast day of these saints is 1 August in both the Eastern Orthodox Church (for which 1 August is also the first day of the Dormition Fast) and the Catholic Church.

=== Theory: Jewish ancient veneration ===
While studying a floor mosaic discovered during the 2012–2016 campaigns at the Huqoq synagogue near the Sea of Galilee and dating to the 4th–5th centuries, Russian researcher Nina V. Braginskaya comes to a different conclusion from that of the dig director, Jodi Magness. Braginskaya puts forward that the mosaic reflects the ancient Jewish veneration of the nine Maccabee martyrs from the books of the Maccabees, which is later perpetuated just in Christianity, while Jewish tradition preserves only the rite of lighting a nine-branched candelabrum during Hanukkah. In her opinion, there is a direct relationship between the Jewish symbolic object and the Christian symbolic story, with the Hanukkah menorah undergoing a one-and-a-half-millennium long secondary symbolic interpretation in Judaism, while the Christian tradition kept the original meaning, that of a martyrdom-for-the-faith tradition. This interpretation would help to explain the unique iconography of this particular mosaic carpet, which is the only one found so far in synagogues of its period depicting scenes not found in the Hebrew Bible. Only due to the discovery of the Huqoq mosaic could the connection between the Jewish and Christian traditions be noticed and proposed for discussion, to Braginskaya.

== Hasmonean rulers ==
- Alexander Jannaeus
- Aristobulus I
- Aristobulus II
- Hyrcanus II
- John Gaddi
- John Hyrcanus
- Jonathan Apphus
- Judas Maccabeus
- Mattathias
- Salome Alexandra
- Simon Thassi

== See also ==
- Modi'in, hometown of the Maccabees, including proposed locations for the site and the Maccabean mausoleum
  - al-Midya, one of the proposed locations
  - Umm al-Umdan, another proposed location
- Judas Maccabaeus by Händel (1746)
- My Glorious Brothers, novel by Howard Fast
- Jewish national movements
