= Ishtori Haparchi =

14th century Jewish physician, topographer, and traveler

Ishtori Haparchi (Isaac Ben Moses)

Personal life
- Born: 1280 Provence
- Died: 1355 (aged 74–75) Bet She'an

Religious life
- Religion: Judaism

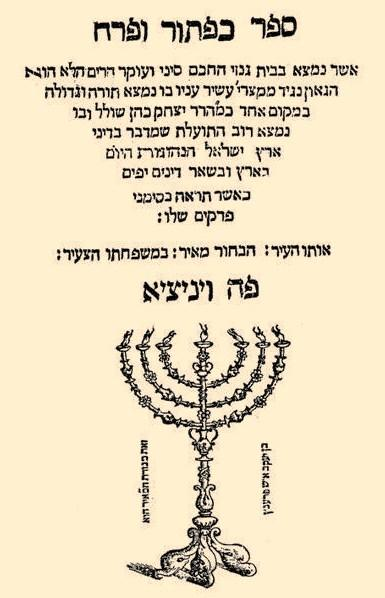
Title page of Ishtori Haparchi's Kaftor VaFerach, Venice 1549. In the first Hebrew book printed on the geography of the land of Israel, 180 locations mentioned in the Bible and Talmudic literature are identified.

Ishtori Haparchi (1280–1355), also Estori Haparchi and Ashtori ha-Parhi (Hebrew: אשתורי הפרחי) is the pen name of the 14th-century Jewish physician, geographer, and traveller, Isaac HaKohen Ben Moses.

== Biography ==
Ishtori Haparchi was born in Jewish Provence in 1280. Haparchi was descended from a line of sages and rabbis of fame. His father was Moshe HaParhi, a distinguished Talmudic scholar. His grandfather was Nathan ben Meir of Trinquetaille, the author of Shaar HaTefisa. His great-grandfather was Meir ben Isaac of Carcassonne, author of Sefer ha-'Ezer.

He studied Torah with his father and grandfather and later with Eliezer ben Yosef of Chinon, who was burned at the stake as a martyr. Subsequently, he continued his studies in Montpellier under Jacob ben Machir ibn Tibbon of the renowned ibn Tibbon family. There are also references suggesting that he studied with Asher ben Jehiel. He had a broad education in both religious and secular studies, as well as in Hebrew, Latin, and Arabic.

When the Jews were expelled from France in 1306, he traveled to Spain and then Bahri Sultanate-ruled Egypt, settling in Bahri-ruled province of Damascus. When he first arrived in what he called the Land of Israel, he settled in Jerusalem, but he left after a year because he disliked his neighbors. He then moved to Besan, now Beit She'an, explaining his choice by saying that it "sits by abundant waters, tranquil streams, a cherished and blessed land, full of joy. like the Garden of the Lord, it yields its bread and opens the gate to paradise". He worked as a physician there, where he died in 1355.

== Pen name ==
HaParchi is commonly known by the title Kaftor va-Ferach taken from the name of his work. Another scholarly opinion suggests that the name HaParchi refers to his birthplace, Florentza in Spain, which translates to "Perach" (Flower) in Hebrew.

Ish Tori, as he refers to himself in his book, may mean "Man of Tours", the capital of the medieval French county of Tourain. Another scholarly opinion suggests that the name Ish Tori refers to his profession and mean "man of tourism", though according to other opinions "Ishtori" was simply his personal name, a single word.

== Works ==
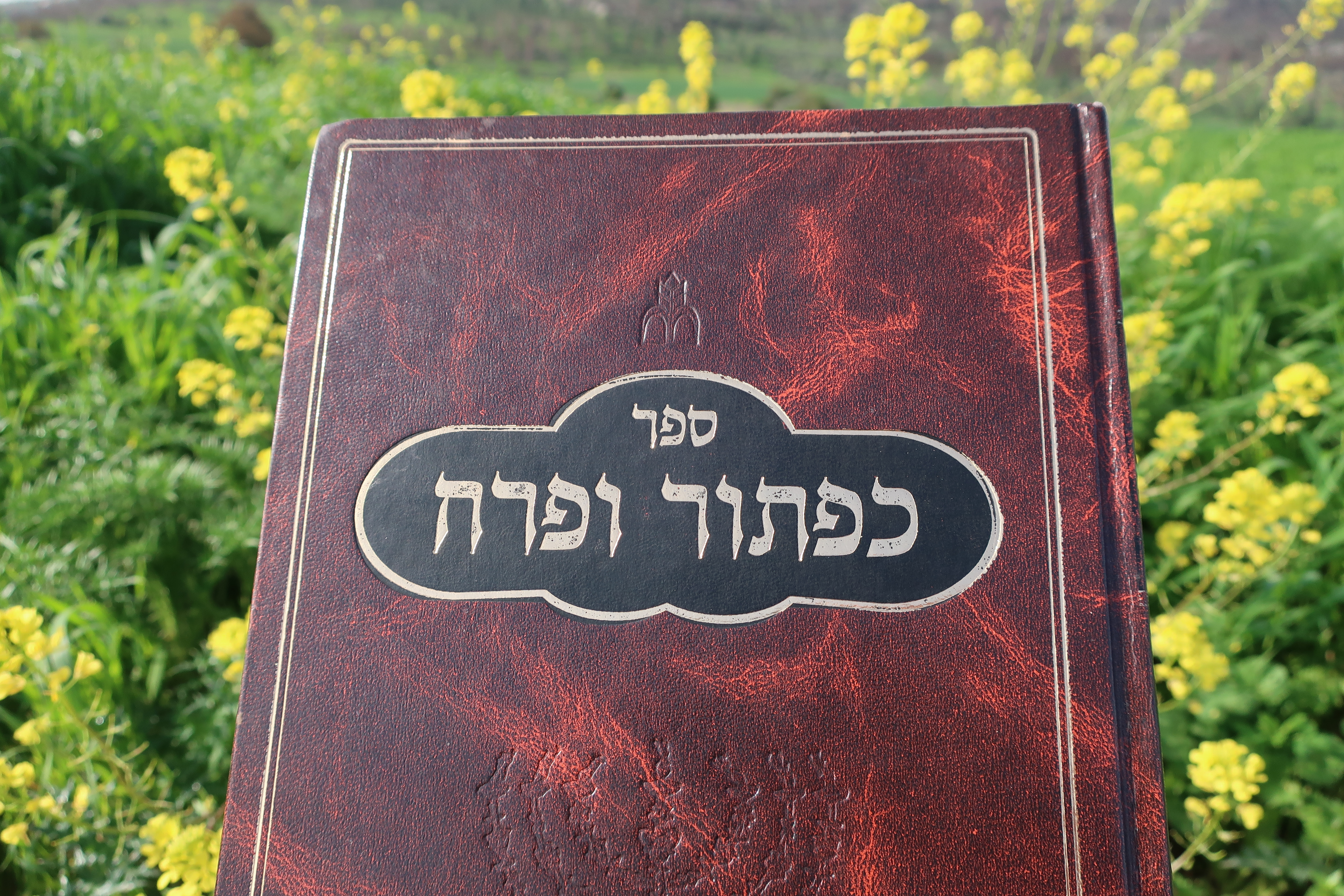
Bulb and Flower by Ishtori Haparchi

In 1306, while in Barcelona, Ishtori Haparchi made a Hebrew translation of the Latin Tabula antidotarii of Armengaud Blaise.

Ishtori Haparchi was the author of the first Hebrew book on the geography of the Holy Land, Bulb and Flower (Hebrew: כפתור ופרח, romanized: Kaftor uféraḥ), written in 1322 in Palestine and published in Venice in 1549. "Bulb and Flower" is a Hebrew idiom meaning 'work of art' and is derived from the description of the temple menorah in Exodus 37:17. In the context of the book it refers to the agrarian laws practised by the people of the land. Haparchi lists the names of towns and villages and discusses the topography of the land based on first-hand visits to the sites. He describes its fruits and vegetables, and draws upon earlier rabbinic commentaries, such as the commentary compiled by Isaac ben Melchizedek of Siponto.

In his work, there are various factual accounts that contribute to the elucidation of contemporary geographical-historical issues. His contribution is so significant that modern scholars have bestowed upon him the title "First Among the Researchers of the Land of Israel". Modern scholarship relies heavily upon the 180 ancient sites he identified and described in relation to other sites, among them Usha (one-time seat of the Sanhedrin), al-Midya (the ancient Modiʿin of the Maccabees) and Battir (the ancient Betar of Bar Kokhba fame).

=== Editions ===
- Edelmann, Ẓevi Hirsch, ed. (1852). ספר כפתור ופרח (in Hebrew). Berlin: Yulius Zittenfeld.
- Luncz, Abraham Moses, ed. (1899). ספר כפתור ופרח (in Hebrew).

== Legacy ==
Ishtori Haparchi was memorialized in the State of Israel by having streets named after him in major cities such as Jerusalem and Tel Aviv. In the Beit She'an area, several sites are named after him: Ein Kaftor and Ein Perach are two springs located between Tirat Zvi and Ein HaNatziv; near Beit She'an, there is Tel Ishtori, as well as a spring named Ma'ayan Ishtori.

In 2015, a book was published compiling scholarly articles in Hebrew focusing on the life and legacy of Ishtori HaParhi; the book is titled Rabbi Ishtori HaParhi: A Pioneer in the Study of the Land of Israel. The volume was edited by Israel Rosenson and Shlomo Glicksberg and was published by Efrata College of Education in Jerusalem.
