= Thine Be the Glory =

Christian hymn

- by George Frideric Handel
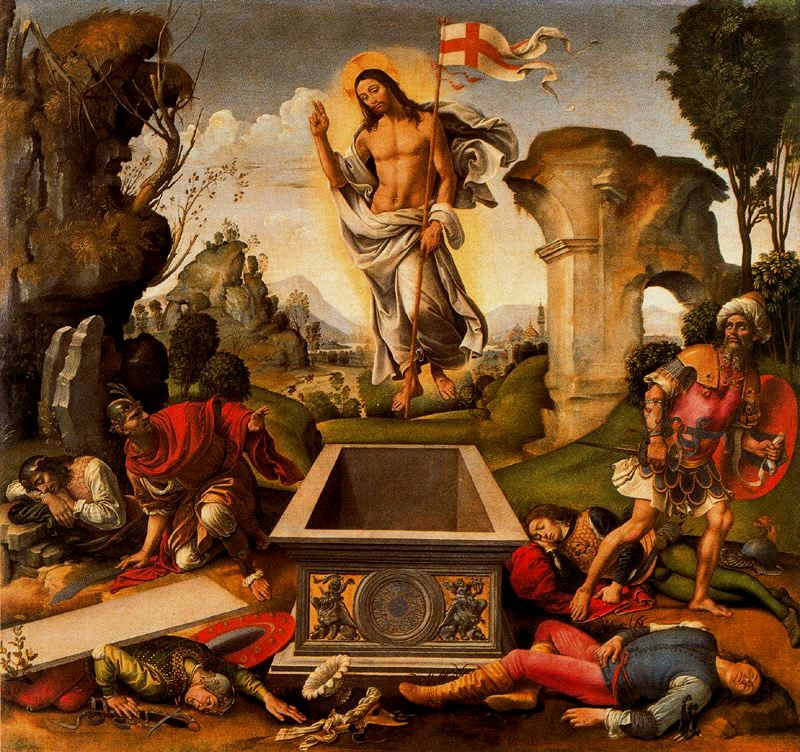
- The Resurrection of Christ by Raffaellino del Garbo (1510)
- Native name: "À toi la gloire"
- Genre: Hymn
- Occasion: Easter
- Written: 1923
- Text: Edmond Budry, translated by Richard Hoyle
- Language: English
- Meter: 10.11.11.11 with refrain
- Melody: From Händel's Judas Maccabeus
- Composed: 1747

"Thine Be the Glory, Risen Conquering Son" (French: À toi la gloire O Ressuscité), also titled "Thine Is the Glory", is a Christian hymn for Easter, written by the Swiss Protestant minister, Edmond Budry (1854–1932), and set to the tune of the chorus "See, the Conqu'ring hero comes" from the third section of Handel's oratorio Judas Maccabaeus. The hymn is sometimes sung at weddings or funerals.

An English translation was made in 1923 by Richard Birch Hoyle (1875–1939). The German Advent hymn Tochter Zion, freue dich uses the same tune.

== History ==
=== Tune ===
"Thine Be the Glory" is sung to the hymn tune Maccabaeus. The tune was originally written by the German-British composer George Frideric Handel. He composed it initially for his 1747 oratorio Joshua, in which it features as a chorus, "See, the Conquering Hero Comes!", celebrating the military victories of the Biblical figure Joshua. The chorus is sung three times, and its final rendition is accompanied by a military side drum. Handel was confident that the tune would prove popular, and claimed to the music historian John Hawkins that "You will live to see it a greater favourite with the people than my other fine things." So confident was Handel of its popularity that he added the chorus to his other oratorio Judas Maccabaeus, written the previous year. "See, the Conquering Hero Comes!" was repurposed to celebrate the military victory of another Old Testament figure, Judas Maccabaeus. Handel's tune bears some historic anti-Jacobite associations. The composition of Judas Maccabaeus was reportedly influenced by Frederick, Prince of Wales; the subject matter of an old testament military victory was chosen as an oblique tribute to the victory of his brother, the Duke of Cumberland, at the Battle of Culloden in April 1746.

In 1796, Ludwig van Beethoven composed twelve variations on "See, the Conquering Hero Comes!" for both piano and cello.

=== Text ===
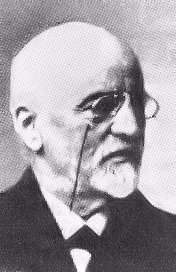
Hymn writer Edmond Louis Budry (1854–1932)

Handel's popular chorus tune was first put to use as a hymn tune in Harmonia Sacra, a hymnal compiled in 1754 by Thomas Butts, in which it is used as a setting for Charles Wesley's hymn "Christ the Lord Is Risen Today". His choice of Handel's militaristic theme was intended to reinforce the metaphor the resurrected Christ as a victorious warrior who has vanquished death and the powers of evil.

In 1884, Handel's tune was used as a setting for a new French-language hymn, "A Toi la Gloire." It was written by Edmond Louis Budry, a minister of the Swiss Eglise évangélique du Canton de Vaud. It is reported that he was inspired to write it after the death of his first wife, Marie de Vayenborg in Lausanne, Switzerland. It was later published in French hymn book Chants Evangéliques (1885), and in the YMCA Hymnbook (1904).

The hymn was first translated from French into English by Richard Birch Hoyle in 1923. He was commissioned to translate the hymn by the World Student Christian Federation after Budry granted authorisation to reproduce it from the French version. It was later published in the World Student Christian Federation's hymn book, Cantate Domino Hymnal. World Student Christian Federation retained copyright on Hoyle's English translation. The hymn's popularity was cemented when it was included in The Methodist Hymn Book in 1933. Today it features in several popular hymnals, including The New English Hymnal Singing the Faith and The Church Hymnary.

Budry's text also celebrates the Resurrection of Jesus with references to the appearance of angels in the scene of the empty tomb. and uses elements of Isaiah 25:8. The hymn makes particular reference to verses of the First Epistle to the Corinthians in the New Testament (1 Corinthians 15). The central theme of the victorious Christ is drawn from 1 Corinthians 15:57: "But thanks be to God, which giveth us the victory through our Lord Jesus Christ.", while line in the second verse of the hymn, "death hath lost its sting", is taken directly from 1 Corinthians 15:55: "O death, where is thy sting? O grave, where is thy victory?". The line "No more we doubt thee" may also be a reference to Doubting Thomas.

=== Other versions ===
The hymn was translated into Danish in 1993 and is no. 240 in Den Danske Salmebog with the title Dig være ære, Herre over dødens magt. It is listed under Easter psalms, but it also considered appropriate for funerals.

There are also versions in many other languages, including Dutch: U zij de glorie, Spanish: A Ti la gloria, Oh nuestro Senor, Czech: Bud’ tobě sláva, jenž jsi z mrtvých vstal, Hungarian: Győzelmet vettél, ó Feltámadott, Norwegian Dig være ære, Herre over dødens makt, Polish O Zmartwychwstaly, ten zwycieski hymn and probably many more.

== Usage ==
The hymn is often used in Easter church services involving the British royal family. It was also played during a service of thanksgiving in commemoration of Queen Elizabeth II's 80th birthday. The hymn is also used during funerals and is listed in the Church of England's funeral services hymn book. During the Last Night of the Proms in the United Kingdom, "Thine Be the Glory" is played after Fantasia on British Sea Songs with attendees traditionally whistling the tune.

In the Netherlands, the original French version is sung during funerals and weddings of the Dutch royal family.

The song was also used as the theme tune for the BBC's coverage of the 2006 FIFA World Cup.

== Lyrics ==
Below are the original lyrics by Edmond Budry with a literal English translation, and Hoyle's translation:

Original Lyrics

À toi la gloire, O Ressuscité!
À toi la victoire pour l’éternité!
Brillant de lumière, l’ange est descendu,
Il roule la pierre du tombeau vaincu.
À toi la gloire, O Ressuscité!
À toi la victoire pour l’éternité!

Vois-le paraître: C’est lui, c’est Jésus,
Ton Sauveur, ton Maître, Oh! ne doute plus!
Sois dans l’allégresse, peuple du Seigneur,
Et redis sans cesse: Le Christ est vainqueur!
À toi la gloire, O Ressuscité!
À toi la victoire pour l’éternité!

Craindrais-je encore? Il vit à jamais,
Celui que j’adore, le Prince de paix;
Il est ma victoire, mon puissant soutien,
Ma vie et ma gloire : non, je ne crains rien!
À toi la gloire, O Ressuscité!
À toi la victoire pour l’éternité!

Literal translation

Thine [be] the glory, Oh resurrected One!
Thine [be] the victory, for eternity!
Shining with light, the angel descended,
He rolled the stone from the conquered grave.
Thine [be] the glory, Oh resurrected One!
Thine [be] the victory, for eternity!

Watch Him coming, it's Him, it's Jesus,
Your Saviour, your Master, Oh, doubt no more!
Rejoice, people of the Lord,
And repeat without ending: Christ is Conqueror!
Thine [be] the glory, Oh resurrected One!
Thine [be] the victory, for eternity!

Shall I still fear? He lives forever,
It is Him whom I adore, the Prince of peace;
He is my Victory, my mighty Reliance
my Life and my Glory: no, I fear nothing!
Thine [be] the glory, Oh resurrected One!
Thine [be] the victory, for eternity!

Hoyle translation

Thine be the glory, risen, conqu'ring Son;
endless is the vict'ry Thou o’er death hast won.
Angels in bright raiment rolled the stone away,
kept the folded grave-clothes where Thy body lay.
Thine be the glory, risen, conqu'ring Son;
endless is the vict'ry Thou o’er death hast won.

Lo, Jesus meets us, risen from the tomb.
Lovingly He greets us, scatters fear and gloom;
let His church with gladness hymns of triumph sing,
for the Lord now liveth; death hath lost its sting.
Thine be the glory, risen, conqu'ring Son;
endless is the vict'ry Thou o’er death hast won.

No more we doubt Thee, glorious Prince of life!
Life is naught without Thee; aid us in our strife;
make us more than conqu'rors, through Thy deathless love;
bring us safe through Jordan to Thy home above.
Thine be the glory, risen, conqu'ring Son;
endless is the vict'ry Thou o’er death hast won.

== Tune ==
The following setting, based on Handel's original, is from the collection "Complete Anglican Hymns Old and New".
