= Al-Midya =

al-Midya
- Municipality type D (Village council)

Arabic transcription(s)
  - Arabic: المدية
  - Latin: al-Midyah (official)
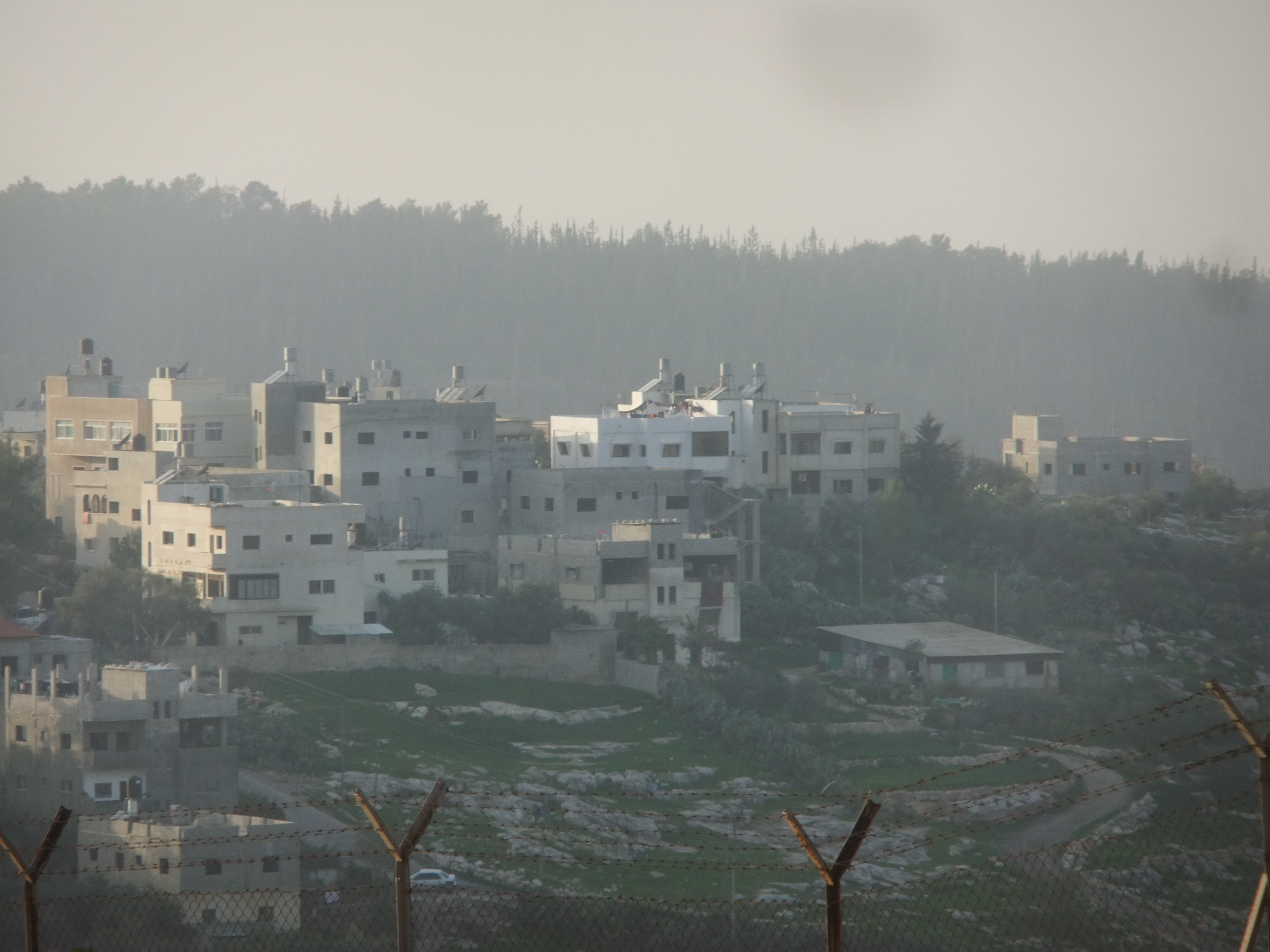
- al-Midya from the east

- Location of al-Midya within Palestine
- Coordinates: 31°56′09″N 35°00′19″E
- Palestine grid: 150/149
- State: State of Palestine
- Governorate: Ramallah and al-Bireh

Government
  - Type: Village council

Area
  - Total: 0.9 km^{2} (0.35 sq mi)

Population (2017)
  - Total: 1,533
  - Density: 1,700/km^{2} (4,400/sq mi)

al-Midya (Arabic: المدية) is a Palestinian village in the Ramallah and al-Bireh Governorate in the western West Bank, located west of Ramallah. According to the Palestinian Central Bureau of Statistics, the village had a population of over 1,533 inhabitants in 2017.

== Location ==
Al Midya is located (horizontally) 18.9 kilometres (12 mi) west of Ramallah. It is bordered by Ni'lin to the east and north, the Green Line (the Armistice Line 1949) to the west, and Saffa to the south.

== History and archaeology ==
=== Iron Age to Byzantine period ===
Al-Midya is one of several sites identified with ancient Modi'in (also Modi'im and Moditha/Mwdyʽyn/t), hometown of the Hasmonean family. The name is thought to have been preserved in its Arabicised form al-Midya.

The ancient village site is located at Ras al-Midya, S-E of the modern village, where pottery from the Iron Age and later periods has been found. Additional findings include the ruins of structures, watering holes, coins from the Hellenistic and Roman periods, and an underground hiding complex where five coins, including two from the Bar Kokhba revolt (130s CE), were discovered.

According to one theory, Modi'in occupied the site of Khirbet er-Râs, directly to the south-east of the modern village. Other sites in the vicinity were also suggested. Based on the archeological data, as well as the site's location, Raviv suggests that it was a Jewish settlement during the Early Roman period.

==== Possible family tomb of the Maccabees ====
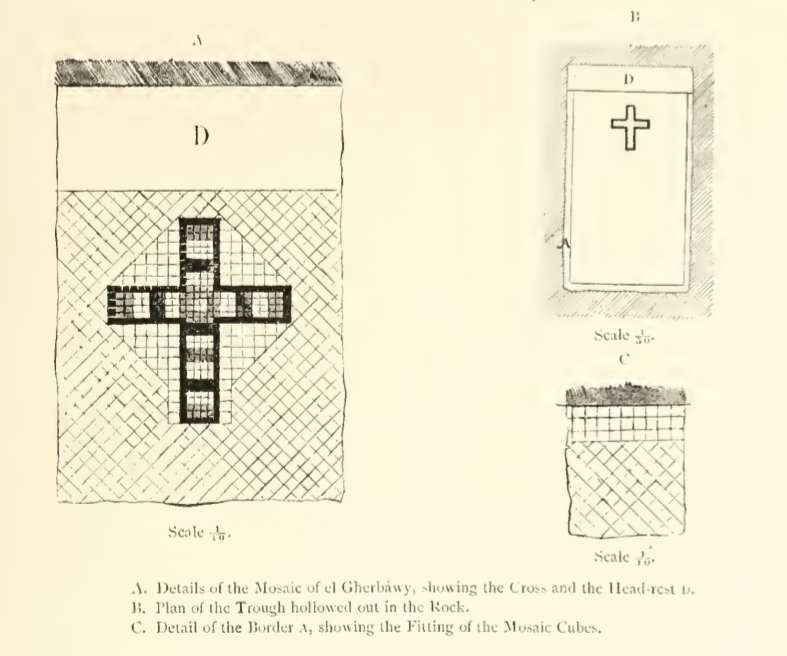
Mosaic crosses from the Byzantine period (5th century or late, found by Clermont-Ganneau in the oldest part of the largest structure at Kh. Sheikh Gharbawi.

Excavations near Midya in the 19th century suggested that graves of the Maccabees were located here. Seven triangular tombs were found, corresponding with the description of the first-century Jewish historian Josephus Flavius, who wrote that the family’s seven pyramid-shaped graves were erected in the same place. In 1870, an ancient structure near the gravesite of Sheikh al-Arabawi/Khirbet Sheikh Gharbawi (Hebrew: Horbat Ha-Gardi), adjacent to al-Midya, was identified as a Hasmonean grave, but this was rejected by another biblical archaeologist, Charles Clermont-Ganneau. Further exploration by the Israel Antiquities Authority in the 21st century suggest the likelihood that Horbat Sheikh Gharbawi (Horbat Ha-Gardi) is either the original family tomb of the Maccabees, or was marking the alleged tomb in the Byzantine period.

=== Mamluk period ===
Al-Midya was apparently mentioned during the Mamluk period by the 14th-century Jewish doctor and geographer Ishtori Haparchi.

=== Ottoman period ===
==== 16th century ====
Al-Midya was incorporated into the Ottoman Empire in 1517 with all of Palestine, and in the 1596 tax−records it appeared under the name of Midya as-Sarqiyya as being in the Nahiya of Ramla, part of Gaza Sanjak. It had a population of 25 Muslim households and paid a fixed tax rate of 25% on wheat, barley, summer crops or olives or fruit trees, and a press for olives or grapes; a total of 6,500 akçe.

==== 19th century ====
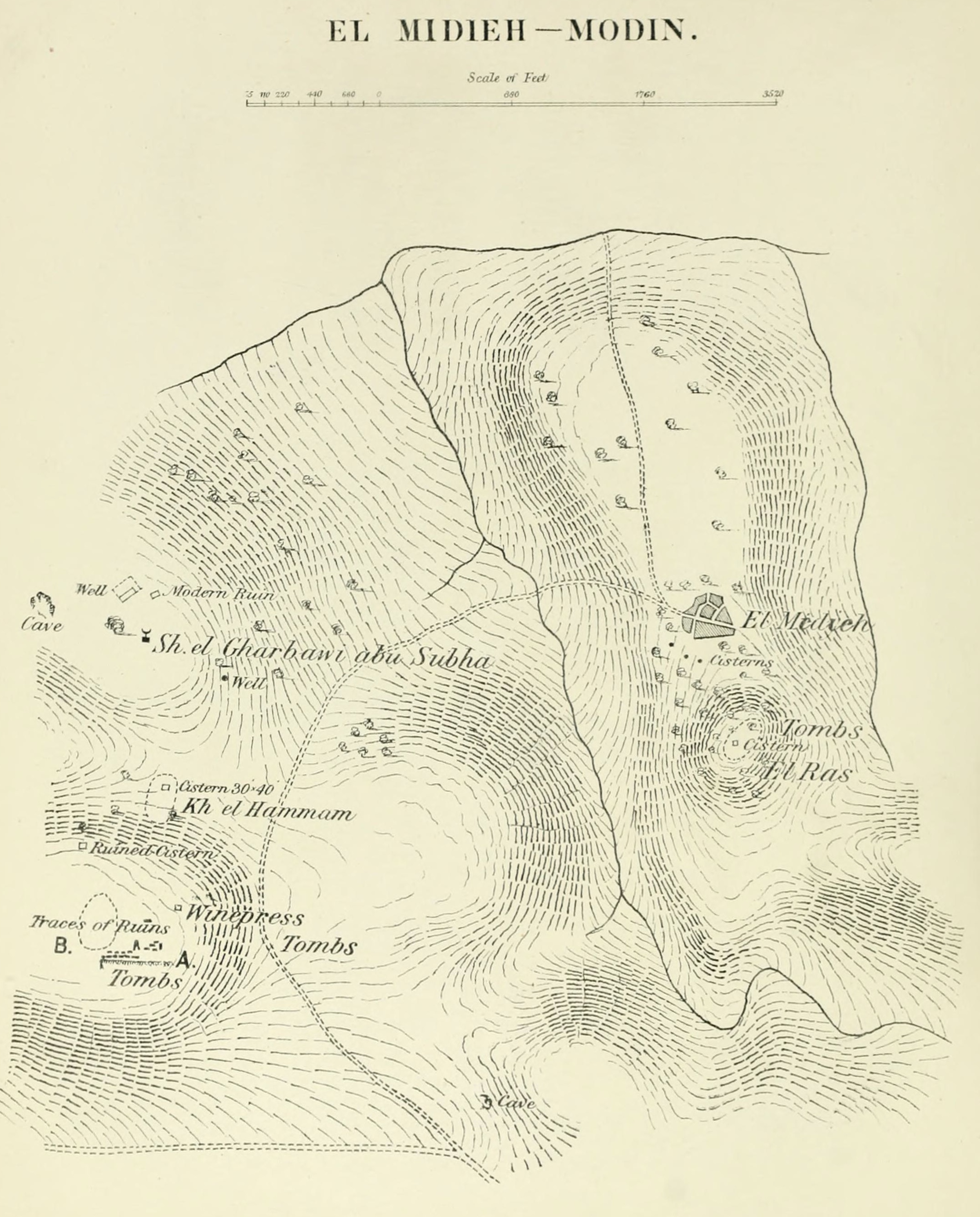
Al Midya in the 1871-77 PEF Survey of Palestine

In 1870, Victor Guérin visited, and thought that ruins found there were the graves of the Maccabees. However, Clermont-Ganneau made extensive excavations later, and he found Christian crosses in the oldest part of the largest structure. He concluded the ruins were from the 5th century or later, that is, from the Byzantine era.

An official Ottoman village list of about 1870 showed that el-medje had a total of 42 houses and a population of 159, though the population count included men only. It also noted that it was located half an hour east of Jimzu.

In 1882, PEF's Survey of Western Palestine described Midieh as being a village of a "good size", with houses either built of adobe or stone. To the north was a small olive grove, to the south a tank. The most "peculiar feature" they found was named er Ras. It was a high conical knoll, with a maqam on top, and rock-cut tombs on the side.

=== British Mandate ===
In the 1922 census of Palestine conducted by the British Mandate authorities, Midya had an all-Muslim population of 245, increasing in the 1931 census to 286, still all-Muslim, in 59 houses.

In the 1945 statistics, the population of el Midya was of 320 Muslims, who owned 7,020 dunams of land according to an official land and population survey. Of this, 688 dunams were plantations and irrigable land, 2,304 for cereals, while 8 dunams were built-up (urban) land.

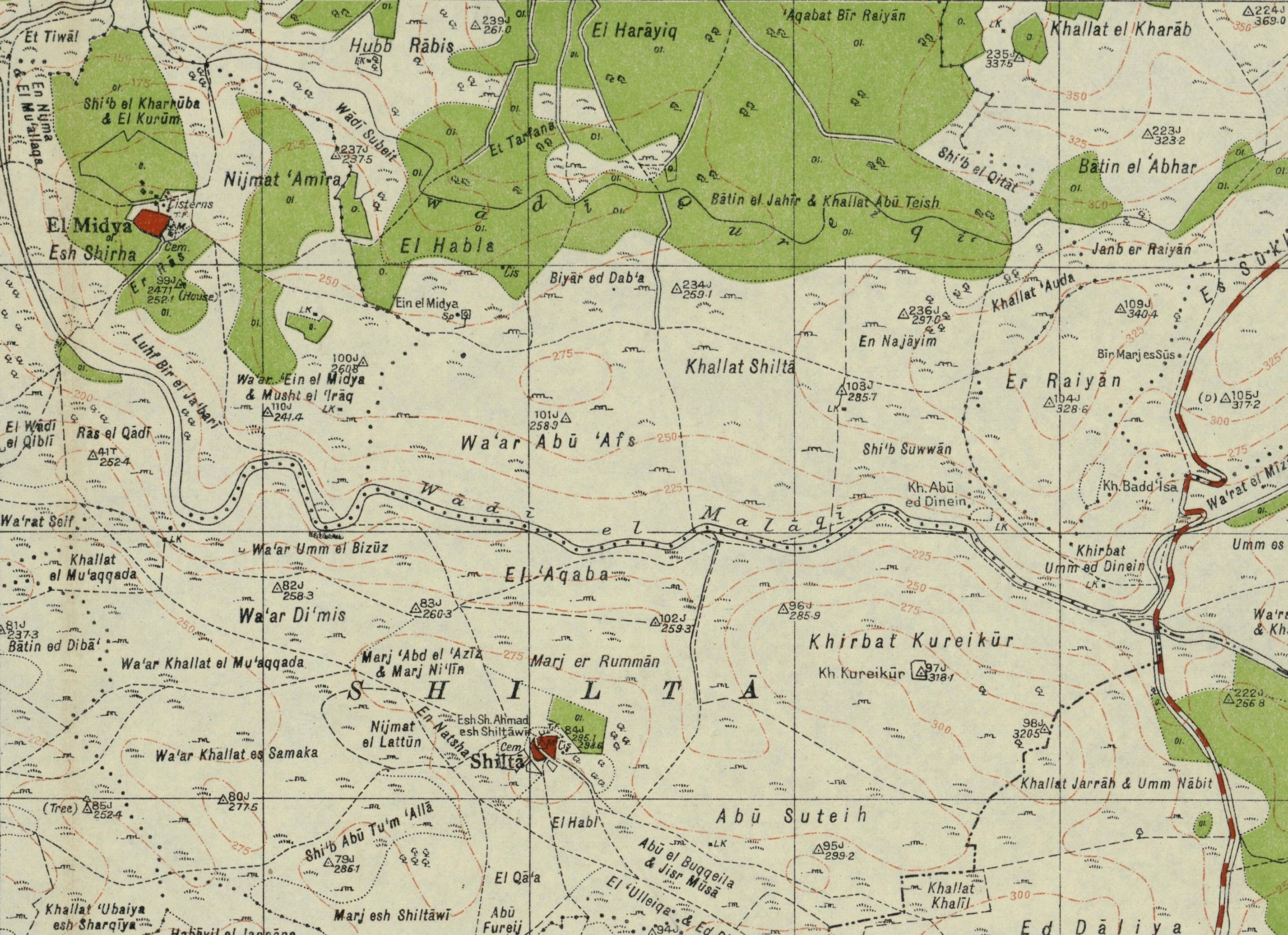
Al-Midya on 1944 1:20,000 map based on 1919 survey

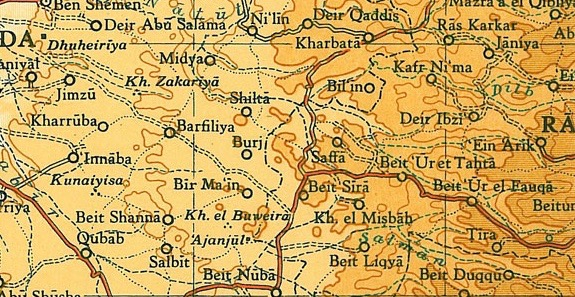
Al-Midya on 1945 1:250,000 map (upper left quadrant)

=== Jordanian period ===
In the wake of the 1948 Arab–Israeli War, and after the 1949 Armistice Agreements, al-Midya came under Jordanian rule.

The Jordanian census of 1961 found 570 inhabitants.

=== 1967-present ===
Since the Six-Day War in 1967, al-Midya has been under Israeli occupation.

According to the Applied Research Institute–Jerusalem, Al-Midya's total land area was 6,959 dunams in 1942, but after 1948 most of the village's western land was expropriated, leaving 892 dunams, of which 217 were classified as built-up (urban) areas.

In 1986, when the population amounted to 570 people, largely dependent on agriculture, the villagers were woken at 3:00 a.m. by the arrival of Israeli military vehicles and were informed that a curfew would be in place until 9 pm that day. Throughout the day, roughly 1,000 Israelis, soldiers protecting the operation and workers from the Israeli Lands Administration and Nature Reserve authorities who drove bulldozers to grade a road down a steep hillside to a rough track running below it, and chainsawed an olive grove extending over 1,100 dunams, destroying 3,000 trees. When the devastation was reported, Israel said the razing was to block Al-Midya from encroaching on Israeli state land, claiming that the olive trees were less than five years old, and planted to secure title to the area. Most cut trunks were over half a metre in diameter, suggesting centuries of growth.

After the 1995 accords, 7.4% of village land was classified as Area B, the remainder 92.6% as Area C. Israel has confiscated 186 dunams of land from Al-Midya for the construction of the Israeli settlement of Hashmonaim.

On 3 June 2022, a 17 year-old Palestinian by the name of Odeh Mohammed Odeh was shot dead by IDF personnel in the village.

== See also ==
- Modi'in (ancient city)

== Bibliography ==
- Barda, Leticia; Haiman, Mordechai (2005-03-10). "Horbat Ha-Gardi, Development Survey in the Area" (117). Hadashot Arkheologiyot – Excavations and Surveys in Israel.
- Barron, J.B., ed. (1923). Palestine: Report and General Abstracts of the Census of 1922. Government of Palestine.
- Clermont-Ganneau, C.S. (1896). [ARP] Archaeological Researches in Palestine 1873-1874, translated from the French by J. McFarlane. Vol. 2. London: Palestine Exploration Fund.
- Conder, C.R.; Kitchener, H.H. (1882). The Survey of Western Palestine: Memoirs of the Topography, Orography, Hydrography, and Archaeology. Vol. 2. London: Committee of the Palestine Exploration Fund. (p. 341 ff, pic.)
- Dauphin, C. (1998). La Palestine byzantine, Peuplement et Populations. BAR International Series 726 (in French). Vol. III : Catalogue. Oxford: Archeopress. ISBN 0-860549-05-4. p. 834-5?
- Finkelstein, I.; Lederman, Zvi, eds. (1997). Highlands of many cultures. Tel Aviv: Institute of Archaeology of Tel Aviv University Publications Section. ISBN 965-440-007-3.
- Government of Jordan, Department of Statistics (1964). First Census of Population and Housing. Volume I: Final Tables; General Characteristics of the Population (PDF).
- Government of Palestine, Department of Statistics (1945). Village Statistics, April, 1945.
- Guérin, V. (1875). Description Géographique Historique et Archéologique de la Palestine (in French). Vol. 2: Samarie, pt. 2. Paris: L'Imprimerie Nationale.
- Hadawi, S. (1970). Village Statistics of 1945: A Classification of Land and Area ownership in Palestine. Palestine Liberation Organization Research Center. Archived from the original on 2018-12-08.
- Hartmann, M. (1883). "Die Ortschaftenliste des Liwa Jerusalem in dem türkischen Staatskalender für Syrien auf das Jahr 1288 der Flucht (1871)". Zeitschrift des Deutschen Palästina-Vereins. 6: 102–149.
- Hütteroth, W.-D.; Abdulfattah, K. (1977). Historical Geography of Palestine, Transjordan and Southern Syria in the Late 16th Century. Erlanger Geographische Arbeiten, Sonderband 5. Erlangen, Germany: Vorstand der Fränkischen Geographischen Gesellschaft. ISBN 3-920405-41-2.
- Kelly, Robert J.; Maghan, Jess (1998). Hate Crime: The Global Politics of Polarization. SIU Press. ISBN 0809322102.
- Mills, E., ed. (1932). Census of Palestine 1931. Population of Villages, Towns and Administrative Areas. Jerusalem: Government of Palestine.
- Palmer, E.H. (1881). The Survey of Western Palestine: Arabic and English Name Lists Collected During the Survey by Lieutenants Conder and Kitchener, R. E. Transliterated and Explained by E.H. Palmer. Committee of the Palestine Exploration Fund. (pp. 235 239)
- Re'em, Amit (2011-06-30). "Horbat Ha-Gardi, Final Report" (123). Hadashot Arkheologiyot – Excavations and Surveys in Israel.
- Socin, A. (1879). "Alphabetisches Verzeichniss von Ortschaften des Paschalik Jerusalem". Zeitschrift des Deutschen Palästina-Vereins. 2: 135–163.
