= Edmond Louis Budry =

Swiss composer (1854–1932)

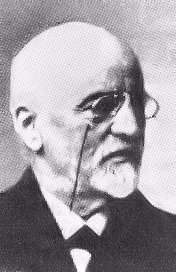
Edmond Louis Budry

Edmond Louis Budry (August 30, 1854 – November 12, 1932) was a Swiss hymn writer famous for writing the lyrics to the hymn "Thine Be the Glory" ("À toi la gloire") to music from Judas Maccabaeus by George Frideric Handel.

Born in Vevey, he studied theology in Lausanne and was a pastor at Cully and Sainte-Croix between 1881 and 1889. He then became pastor of the Free Church in Vevey for a further 35 years, retiring in 1923. Besides writing original hymns, he translated German, English, and Latin lyrics into French. Some of his work appeared in Chants Evangéliques (Lausanne, Switzerland: 1885). Some of his work was translated into German by Johanna Meyer (1851–1921). He died in Vevey and is buried in Cully.

== Hymns ==
- "Béni soit le lien"
- "Les cieux et la terre célèbrent en chœur"
- "À toi la gloire"
- "Arrête, ô pécheur, arrête!"
- "Viens à la croix, âme perdue
- "Mon âme est libérée"
- "Rends-toi maître de nos âmes"
- "Comme une terre altérée"
