= Tochter Zion, freue dich =

German Advent song

- Christian hymn
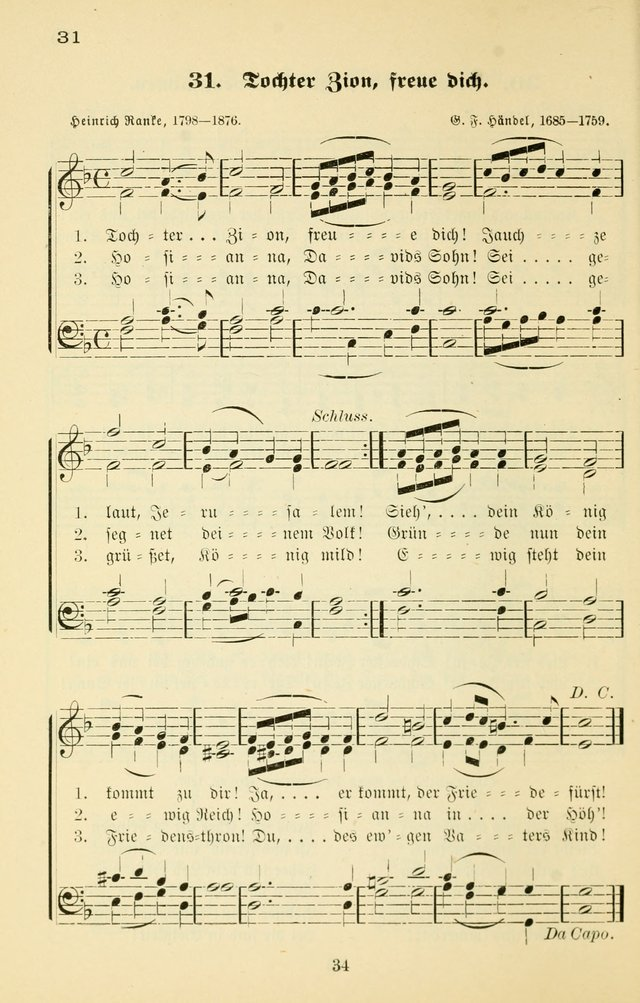
- In Liederkranz für Sonntags-Schulen und Jugend-Vereine, St. Louis, 1898
- Text: Friedrich Heinrich Ranke
- Language: German
- Based on: Movement from Joshua
- Melody: George Frideric Handel
- Composed: 1747
- Published: 1826

"Tochter Zion, freue dich" (Daughter Zion, rejoice) is an Advent song in German. The text was written by Friedrich Heinrich Ranke, based on music derived from two of Handel's oratorios. The song was published in 1826, assigned to the Entry into Jerusalem. The hymn is part of the German Protestant hymnal Evangelisches Gesangbuch as EG 13 and the 2013 Catholic hymnal Gotteslob as GL 228, both four-part settings in the Advent section.

The French hymn À toi la gloire O Ressuscité and its English translation Thine Be the Glory use the same tune.

== History ==
Friedrich Heinrich Ranke wrote the text, based on music by George Frideric Handel, for a musical salon of Karl Georg von Raumer around 1820. He knew the music as Seht, er kommt, mit Preis gekrönt , a chorus from Handel's oratorio Judas Maccabaeus. Handel had first composed it in 1747 for the oratorio Joshua, and added it to Judas Maccabaeus in a 1751 revised version, as See, the Conquering Hero Comes. In both works, the music reflects the triumphant entry of a victorious hero.

The hymn was first published in Hamburg in 1826 in the collection Christliche, liebliche Lieder by Louise Reichardt, Raumer's sister-in-law, and assigned to the Entry into Jerusalem, which at the time had the same prescribed readings as the First Sunday in Advent. It entered collections for schools and became popular.

The hymn is part of the German Protestant hymnal Evangelisches Gesangbuch as EG 13 and the 2013 Catholic hymnal Gotteslob as GL 228, both four-part settings in the Advent section.

== Music ==
Handel's music is a chorus with short lines, sung in homophony. It is written in march rhythm and harmonic simplicity. In Handel's works, the first of three stanzas is scored for three voices, two sopranos and an alto, accompanied by two horns and organ. A second stanza with different text is written for two sopranos, two flutes and organ. Finally, the third stanza, with the text of the first, is sung by four choral parts and a rich basso continuo in dramatic development. Ranke used only the four-part setting, which he modified slightly.

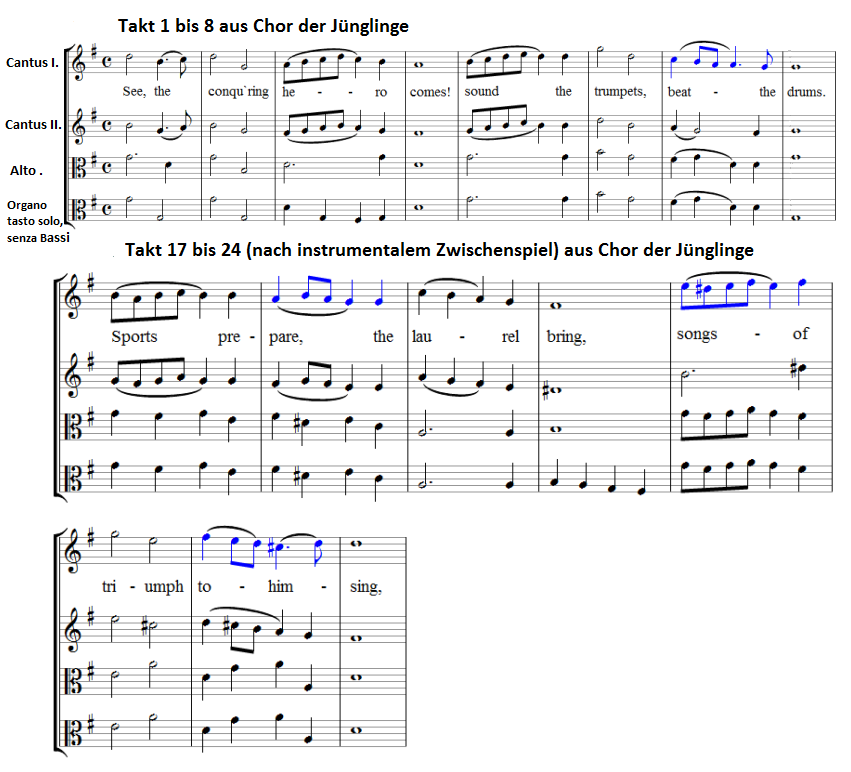
Handel's original version, with English text, has a slightly different melody.
