= Jesus Christ Is Risen Today =

Easter Christian hymn

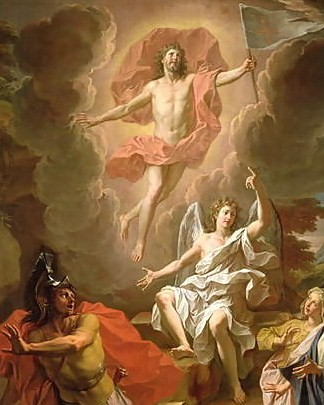
- The Resurrection of Christ by Noël Coypel (1700)
- Genre: Hymn
- Based on: Mark 16:6
- Meter: 7.7.7.7 with alleluia
- Melody: "Easter Hymn"

"Jesus Christ Is Risen Today"
Jesus Christ Is Risen Today

"Jesus Christ Is Risen Today" is a Christian hymn. It was initially written in the 14th century as a Bohemian Latin hymn titled "Surrexit Christus hodie". It is an Easter hymn referring to the Resurrection of Jesus and based on Matthew 28:6, Acts 2:32, 1 Peter 3:18 and Revelation 1:17-18.

== History ==
"Jesus Christ Is Risen Today" was first written in Latin titled "Surrexit Christus hodie", as a Bohemian hymn in the 14th century by an unknown author on manuscripts written in Munich and Breslau. In Latin, it had eleven verses. It was first translated into English in 1708 by John Baptist Walsh to be included in his Lyra Davidica (Collection of Divine Songs and Hymns). The verses of the hymn were revised in 1749 by John Arnold. Initially the hymn only had three verses translated with just the first verse being a direct translation; in 1740 Charles Wesley (one of the founders of Methodism) added a fourth verse to the hymn as an alternative, which was later adopted into the hymn as part of it. The hymn is also noted for having Alleluia in melisma as a refrain after every line.

The hymn is set to a piece of music entitled "Easter Hymn" which was composed in the Lyra Davidica for "Jesus Christ Is Risen Today". There was a later version of "Easter Hymn" composed by William Henry Monk which is also used for "Jesus Christ Is Risen Today". Some denominations of Christianity often just use one while some use both. The hymn is sometimes confused with "Christ the Lord Is Risen Today", which was written by Wesley. This is because the wording is similar and "Christ the Lord Is Risen Today" is usually likewise sung to "Easter Hymn" with Llanfair generally being the most common alternative .
