= Lyra Davidica =

1708 Anglican hymnal

The Lyra Davidica ("the harp of David"; expanded title: Lyra Davidica, or a Collection of Divine Songs and Hymns, Partly New[ly] Composed, Partly Translated from the High-German and Latin Hymns) is a collection of hymns and tunes first published in 1708. The volume was published by John Walsh (printer). The collection was one of many containing hymns translated (mostly) from German, at a time when Anglicanism was heavily influenced by German evangelical pietism.

== Only surviving melody ==
One well-known hymn from the collection is the Easter hymn "Jesus Christ Is Risen Today", whose melody is the only one which has survived since the original publication in 1708.

== Impact ==
Philip Pullman named Lyra Belacqua, the heroine of his trilogy His Dark Materials, after the Lyra Davidica.
