= Bernard Lord Manning =

British historian

Bernard Lord Manning (31 December 1892 – 8 December 1941) was a British historian.

He was born the son of Rev. G. Manning of Ravenstondedale, Westmorland, and was educated at Caistor Grammar School and Jesus College, Cambridge. He was editor of the Cambridge Review between 1916 and 1918, during which time he was also Donaldson Bye-Fellow of Magdalene College, Cambridge. Between 1919 and 1921 he was educational adviser to Indian students at Cambridge and between 1920 and 1933 he was Bursar of Jesus College.

== Works ==
- The People's Faith in the Time of Wyclif (Cambridge University Press, 1919).
- The Making of Modern English Religion: An Historical Impression of Certain Religious Forces in Modern English History (Student Christian Movement, 1929).
- Essays in Orthodox Dissent (Independent Press, 1939).
- The Hymns of Wesley and Watts: Five Informal Papers (Epworth Press, 1942).
- A Layman in the Ministry: Sermons and Addresses (Independent Press, 1942).
