= Judas Maccabaeus (Handel) =

1746 oratorio by George Frideric Handel

- Oratorio by George Frideric Handel
- Handel portrayed by Balthasar Denner, 1729
- Catalogue: HWV 63
- Year: 1746
- Text: by Thomas Morell
- Language: English
- Based on: 1 Maccabees
- Performed: 1 April 1747: London Royal Opera House
- Movements: 68

Judas Maccabaeus (HWV 63) is an oratorio in three acts composed in 1746 by George Frideric Handel based on a libretto written by Thomas Morell. The oratorio was devised as a compliment to the victorious Prince William Augustus, Duke of Cumberland upon his return from the Battle of Culloden (16 April 1746). Other catalogues of Handel's music have referred to the work as HG xxii; and HHA 1/24.

== Synopsis ==
Morell's libretto is based on the deuterocanonical (or apocryphal) book 1 Maccabees (2–8), with motives added from the Jewish Antiquities by Josephus.

The events depicted in the oratorio are from the period 170–160 BC when Judea was ruled by the Seleucid Empire which undertook to destroy the Jewish religion. Being ordered to worship Zeus, many Jews obeyed under the threat of persecution; however, some did not. One who defied was the elderly priest Mattathias who killed a fellow Jew who was about to offer a pagan sacrifice. After tearing down a pagan altar, Mattathias retreated to the hills and gathered others who were willing to fight for their faith.

Handel's music depicts the changing moods of the Jewish people as their fortunes vary from dejection to jubilation.

=== Part 1 ===
The people mourn the death of their leader Mattathias, but his son Simon tries to restore their faith and calls them to arms (Arm, arm, ye brave). Simon's brother, Judas Maccabaeus, assumes the role of leader and inspires the people with thoughts of liberty and victory through the power of Jehovah.

=== Part 2 ===
The people have been victorious, but Judas is concerned that vanity will cause the people to claim victory for themselves. When news arrives that the Seleucid commander Gorgias is preparing to enact revenge, the people's joyous mood gives way to wailing and dejection (Ah! wretched Israel!). Again Judas rallies the people (Sound an alarm) and insists that the pagan altars must be destroyed and that false religions must be resisted.

=== Part 3 ===
Victory has finally been achieved for the Jewish people (See, the Conqu'ring Hero Comes!). News arrives that Rome is willing to form an alliance with Judas against the Seleucid empire. The people rejoice that peace has at last come to their country (O lovely peace).

== First performance ==
The first performance took place on 1 April 1747 at the Royal Opera House in London, and Judas Maccabaeus became one of Handel's most popular oratorios. The General Advertiser (issued on the day prior to the concert) announced the event as:

COVENT-GARDEN
At the Theatre-Royal in Covent-Garden
To-morrow, will be perform'd a New Oratorio,
call'd
JUDAS MACCHABAEUS
With a New Concerto
Pit and Boxes to be put together, and no
Person to be admitted without Tickets, which
will be delivered that Day, at the Office at
Covent-Garden Theatre, at Half a Guinea
each. First Gallery 5s.; Second Gallery 3s.6d.
The Galleries to be Open'd at Half an Hour
after Four o'Clock.
Pit and Boxes at Five.
To begin at Half an Hour after Six o'Clock.

The performers in this original 1747 production included:

- Judas: John Beard (tenor)
- Israelite man: Caterina Galli (mezzo-soprano)
- Israelite woman: Elisabetta de Gambarini (soprano)
- Simon, brother to Judas: Thomas Reinhold (bass)
- Eupolemus, Jewish ambassador to Rome: Thomas Reinhold (bass)

=== Three additions ===
The chorus See, the Conqu'ring Hero Comes! was composed during the summer of 1747 for Handel's next oratorio, Joshua. In the wake of its popularity, probably in 1751, Handel added it to Judas Maccabaeus. The duet Sion Now Her Head Shall Raise was written in 1757 and added the next year. And Wise Men, Flatt’ring, May Deceive Us, the Israelitish Woman’s Act II aria, was written in 1758, using a melody originally penned by Handel in 1709, and made part of Judas Maccabaeus right away. All three are considered nowadays as integral to the work, in contrast to the trend in most of Handel's music to defer to the original.

== Publication ==
The oratorio was published in London after the composer's death by William Randall, the successor to John Walsh the Younger.

Judas Maccabaeus was translated into German and published in 1866 as Volume 22 of the complete works series of the Händel-Gesellschaft.

== Literary reference ==
Come, ever smiling Liberty, / And with thee bring thy jocund train is sung by Maria, the heroine of Mary Wollstonecraft's novel Maria (1798), at the point where she believes herself to have escaped from her abusive husband. She calls her state "Comparative liberty", suggesting that "the jocund train lagged far behind!" because she takes no pleasure in her need for the separation.

== Adaptations ==
=== Reorchestration ===
A re-orchestration of Judas Maccabaeus has been attributed to Mozart. This arrangement sets a German version of the libretto. It survives as a score in an unknown hand which was presented to the Halifax Choral Society in 1850. It has been performed and published after being rediscovered in 2001.

It has been suggested that this version of Judas Maccabaeus represents one of the projects instigated by Mozart's patron Gottfried van Swieten, who promoted the revival of baroque music. The score updates Handel's original in a similar way to Mozart's 1789 version of Handel's Messiah. However, unlike the re-orchestration of Messiah, which is definitely by Mozart, it has not been possible to confirm Judas Maccabaeus was his.

=== Nazi text ===
Under the Nazis the work was subject to "aryanization", a new text being provided so that Handel's music could be performed without reference to Jewish culture.

=== See, the Conqu'ring Hero Comes! ===
The third act chorus See, the Conqu'ring Hero Comes! has been adapted and re-used several times.

In Britain during the 19th century, "See, the Conqu'ring Hero Comes!" gained familiarity as a tune frequently played by brass bands at the opening of new railway lines and stations.

Ludwig van Beethoven composed twelve variations for piano and cello in 1796 (WoO 45). Later, Henry Wood used the tune for a movement in his Fantasia on British Sea Songs (1905), which is regularly played at the Last Night of the Proms.

As a hymn tune, Handel's melody is most frequently associated with two texts: the German Advent song "Tochter Zion, freue dich" by Friedrich Heinrich Ranke (first published in 1826); and as an Easter hymn based on a French-language text by the Swiss writer Edmond Louis Budry ("À toi la gloire, O Ressuscité!"), which was later translated into English by R B Hoyle (1875-1939) as "Thine Be the Glory".

A Hebrew language version of the hymn was composed by Levin Kipnis in 1936, titled "Hava Narima " (הבה נרימה, "Let us raise"). This version maintains the theme of Judas Maccabaeus and his victories against the Seleucid Empire, and due to its subject matter is popularly sung during Hanukkah by Jewish communities in Israel and elsewhere.

The melody of the refrain has also been used for the number rhyme "One, two, buckle my shoe".

== Orchestration ==
The following orchestration was recorded by Chrysander in the Händel-Gesellschaft edition of 1866:

- violins I, II
- violas
- cellos
- basses (double-bass, bassi)
- recorders I, II (flauto)
- oboes I, II
- flutes I, II (traversa)
- horns I, II (corno)
- trumpets I, II, III (tromba)
- bassoon I, II (fagotti)
- timpani
- organ
- keyboard

== Dramatis personae ==
- Judas Maccabaeus (tenor)
- Simon, his Brother (bass)
- Israelitish Woman (soprano)
- Israelitish Man (mezzo-soprano)
- Eupolemus, the Jewish Ambassador to Rome (alto)
- First Messenger (alto)
- Second Messenger (bass)
- Chorus of Israelites
- Chorus of Youths
- Chorus of Virgins

== Summary ==
The following table summarises the movements of the oratorio.

Part	No.	Type	Title	Voices	Tempo	Time Signature	Key Signature
1	1	Overture			Largo, Allegro, Largo	4/4, 3/8, 4/4	G minor
1	2	Chorus	Mourn, ye afflicted children	Soprano, Alto, Tenor, Bass	Largo	4/4	C minor
1	3	Recitative	Well may your sorrows	Israelitish man (Tenor)		4/4	
1	4	Duet	From this dread scene	Israelitish man (Tenor), Israelitish woman (Alto)	Andante e staccato	3/4	G minor
1	5	Chorus	For Sion lamentation make	Soprano, Alto, Tenor, Bass	Larghetto e un poco piano, Adagio	12/8, 4/4	F minor
1	6	Recitative	Not vain is all this storm of grief	Simon		4/4	
1	7	Air	Pious orgies	Israelitish woman	Largo e sostenuto	4/4	E♭ major
1	8	Chorus	O Father, whose Almighty power	Soprano, Alto, Tenor, Bass	Larghetto, Allegro	3/4, 4/4	B♭ major
1	9	Recitative (accompanied)	I feel the Deity within	Simon		4/4	
1	10	Air	Arm, arm, ye brave	Simon	Allegro	4/4	C major
1	11	Chorus	We come, in bright array	Soprano, Alto, Tenor, Bass	Allegro	3/4	C major
1	12	Recitative	'Tis well, my friends	Judas Maccabaeus		4/4	
1	13	Air	Call forth thy powers	Judas Maccabaeus	Allegro	4/4	D major
1	14	Recitative	To Heaven's Almighty King we kneel	Israelitish woman		4/4	
1	15	Air	O Liberty, thou choicest treasure	Israelitish woman	Largo	4/4	A major
1	16	Air	Come, ever-smiling Liberty	Israelitish woman	Andante	6/8	A major
1	17	Recitative	O Judas, may these noble views inspire	Israelitish man		4/4	
1	18	Air	'Tis Liberty	Israelitish man	Larghetto, Adagio, Larghetto	4/4	E major
1	19	Duet	Come, ever-smiling Liberty	Israelitish woman, Israelitish man (mezzo-soprano)	Andante	6/8	A major
1	20	Chorus	Lead on, lead on	Soprano, Alto, Tenor, Bass	Allegro	4/4	D major
1	21	Recitative (end accompanied)	So willed my father	Judas Maccabaeus		4/4	
1	22	Chorus	Disdainful of danger	Alto, Tenor, Bass	Allegro	3/8	G major
1	23	Recitative	Ambition! if e'er honour was thine aim	Judas Maccabaeus		4/4	
1	24	Air	No unhallow'd desire	Judas Maccabaeus	Allegro	6/8	B♭ major
1	25	Recitative	Haste we, my brethren	Israelitish man (Tenor)		4/4	
1	26	Chorus	Hear us, O Lord	Soprano, Alto, Tenor, Bass	A tempo giusto	4/4	F major
2	27	Chorus	Fallen is the foe	Soprano, Alto, Tenor, Bass	Allegro moderato	4/4	D minor
2	28	Recitative	Victorious hero	Israelitish man		4/4	
2	29	Air	So rapid thy course is	Israelitish man	Allegro, Adagio (last five bars)	3/8	G major
2	30	Recitative	Well may hope our freedom to receive	Israelitish man (Soprano)		4/4	
2	31	Duet	Sion now her head shall raise	Israelitish woman, Israelitish man (Soprano)	Andante	3/4	G major
2	32	Chorus	Tune your harps	Soprano (1st & 2nd), Alto, Tenor, Bass	Andante	3/4	G major
2	33	Recitative	O let eternal honours crown his name	Israelitish woman		4/4	
2	34	Air	From mighty kings he took the spoil	Israelitish woman	Andante, Allegro (fine)	12/8, 4/4 (fine)	A major
2	35	Duet	Hail, Judea, happy land	Israelitish man (Contralto), Israelitish woman	Allegro	4/4	D major
2	36	Chorus	Hail, Judea, happy land	Soprano, Alto, Tenor, Bass	Allegro	4/4	D major
2	37	Recitative	Thanks to my brethren	Judas Maccabaeus		4/4	
2	38	Air	How vain is man who boasts in fight	Judas Maccabaeus	Andante	4/4	F major
2	39	Recitative	O Judas! O my brethren	Israelitish messenger (Alto)		4/4	
2	40	Air	Ah! wretched Israel	Israelitish woman	Largo	3/4	C minor
2	41	Chorus	Ah! wretched Israel	Soprano, Alto, Tenor, Bass	Largo, Adagio (ending)	3/4	C minor
2	42	Recitative	Be comforted	Simon		4/4	
2	43	Air	The Lord worketh wonders	Simon	Allegro	4/4	A minor
2	44	Recitative	My arms! against this Gorgias will I go	Judas Maccabaeus		4/4	
2	45	Air	Sound an alarm	Judas Maccabaeus	Allegro	6/8	D major
2	46	Chorus	We hear	Soprano, Alto, Tenor, Bass	Allegro	6/8	D major
2	47	Recitative	Enough! to Heaven we leave	Simon		4/4	
2	48	Air	With pious hearts	Simon	Larghetto	3/4	G minor
2	49	Recitative	Ye worshippers of God	Israelitish man (Contralto)		4/4	
2	50	Air	Wise men, flattering, may deceive you	Israelitish woman	Larghetto	3/4	F major
2	51	Duet	O never bow we down	Israelitish woman, Israelitish man (Contralto)	Andante	3/4	C minor
2	52	Chorus	We never will bow down	Soprano, Alto, Tenor, Bass	Andante	3/4	C minor, C major
3	53	Air	Father of Heaven	Israelitish man (Contralto)	Andante larghetto	4/4	F major
3	54	Recitative	See, see yon flames	Israelitish man (Contralto)		4/4	
3	55	Recitative	O grant it, Heaven	Israelitish woman		4/4	
3	56	Air	So shall the lute and harp awake	Israelitish woman	Allegro, Adagio (ending)	4/4	B♭ major
3	57	Recitative	From Capharsalama	Israelitish messenger (Alto), Israelitish messenger (Bass)		4/4	
3	58	Chorus of Youths; Chorus of Virgins; Chorus	See the conquering hero comes	Soprano (1st & 2nd), Alto; Soprano (1st & 2nd); Soprano, Alto, Tenor, Bass		2/2	G major
3	59	March			Allegro	2/2	G major
3	60	Duet; Chorus	Sing unto God	Alto, Tenor; Soprano, Alto, Tenor, Bass	Allegro	4/4	D major
3	61	Recitative	Sweet flow the strains	Judas Maccabaeus		4/4	
3	62	Air	With honour let desert be crowned	Judas Maccabaeus	Andante larghetto	4/4	A minor
3	63	Recitative	Peace to my countrymen	Eupolemus		4/4	
3	64	Chorus	To our great God	Soprano, Alto, Tenor, Bass	Allegro	4/4	G minor
3	65	Recitative	Again to earth let gratitude descend	Israelitish woman		4/4	
3	66	Duet	O lovely peace	Israelitish woman, Israelitish man (Alto)	Allegro	6/8	G major
3	67	Air	Rejoice, O Judah	Simon	Andante allegro	4/4	D major
3	68	Chorus	Hallelujah, Amen	Soprano, Alto, Tenor, Bass	Allegro, Adagio (ending)	4/4	D major

== Recordings ==
Judas Maccabaeus discography
Year	Cast (Judas Maccabaeus t, Israelitish Woman s, Simon bar, Israelitish Man ms, Messenger a, Eupolemus bs)	Conductor, orchestra and chorus	Label
1963	Jan Peerce; Martina Arroyo; David Smith; Mary Davenport; Mary Davenport; Lawrence Avery	Thomas Scherman; Vienna State Opera orchestra Vienna Academy chorus	CD: VoxBox; Cat: 5125
1971	Alexander Young; Heather Harper; John Shirley-Quirk; Helen Watts; Patricia Clark; Jean Temperley	Johannes Somary; English Chamber Orchestra; Amor Artis Chorale	CD: Vanguard Classics; Cat: OVC 4072
April 1976, Watford Town Hall	Ryland Davies; Felicity Palmer; John Shirley-Quirk; Janet Baker; Paul Esswood; Christopher Keyte	Charles Mackerras; English Chamber Orchestra; Wandsworth School Choir	CD: Deutsche Grammophon; Cat: 447692
1992	Jamie MacDougall; Emma Kirkby; Catherine Denley; Michael George; James Bowman; Simon Birchall	Robert King; The King's Consort; Choir of New College Oxford	CD: Hyperion; Cat: CDA66641/2
1993	Guy de Mey; Lisa Saffer; David Thomas; Patricia Spence; Brian Asawa; Leroy Kromm	Nicholas McGegan; Philharmonia Baroque Orchestra; U.C. Berkeley Chamber chorus	CD: Harmonia Mundi; Cat: HMX 2907374.75
2009	Timothy Bentch; Andrea Lauren Brown; Ed Bara; Dana Wilson; Richard Shapp; Tatyana Rashkovsky	Valentin Radu; Ama Deus Ensemble Baroque orchestra and chorus	CD: Lyrichord; Cat: LEMS 8070
2019	Kenneth Tarver; Deanna Breiwick; Joao Fernandes; Sophie Harmsen; Owen Willetts; N/A	Laurence Cummings; Göttingen International Handel Festival orchestra NDR chorus	CD: Accent Records; Cat: ACC26410
