= Jacob Owen =

Welsh-born Irish architect (1778–1870)

Jacob Owen FRIAI MRIA CEng FIEI FRZSI
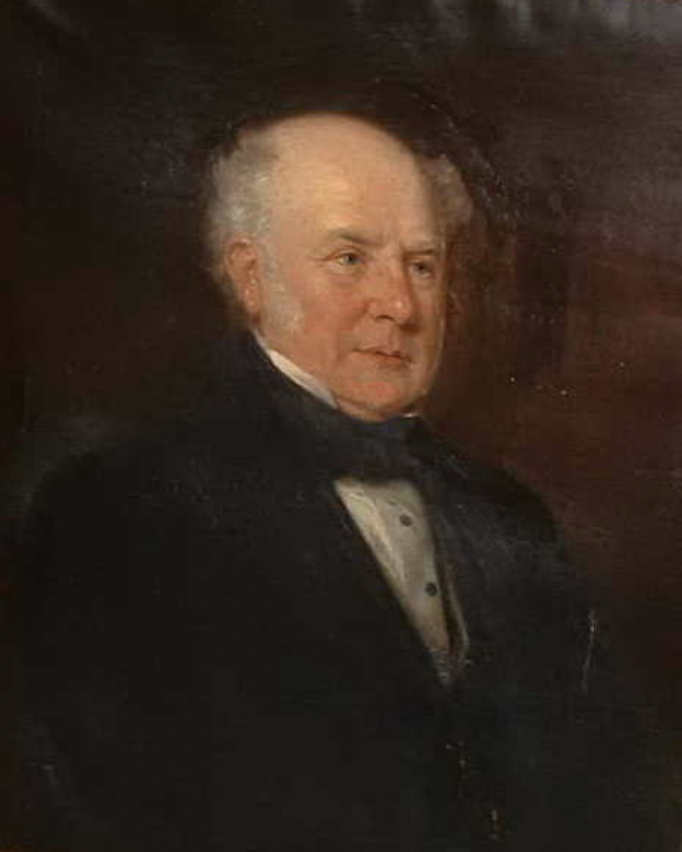
- Born: 28 July 1778; Llanfihangel, Montgomeryshire, North Wales
- Died: 29 October 1870 (aged 92); Toll End, Tipton, Staffordshire, England
- Resting place: Mount Jerome Cemetery, Dublin
- Occupation: Architect
- Spouse(s): 1) Mary Underhill (m. 1798; died 1858) 2) Elizabeth Donnet Fry (née Louder)
- Children: 17, including Jeremiah, Thomas and Joseph
- Relatives: Charles Lanyon (son-in-law); Thomas Pretious Heslop (grandson); Owen Lanyon (grandson)
- Buildings: Dublin Castle, Áras an Uachtaráin, Four Courts
- Projects: significant public buildings in Dublin and Ireland

Jacob Owen FRIAI MRIA CEng FIEI FRZSI (28 July 1778 – 29 October 1870) was a British architect, civil engineer, and public administrator of the nineteenth century. His architectural work is closely associated with Dublin, Ireland. He also contributed extensively to shaping public architecture throughout Ireland, through his design and oversight of schools, asylums, prisons and other public buildings associated with British rule.

== Biography ==
=== Early life and training ===
Jacob Owen was born on 28 July 1778 in Llanfihangel-yng-Ngwynfa, Wales, the son of Margaret Owen (née Ellis) of Llanfihangel and Jacob Owen of St Chad's parish, Shrewsbury. (Note: His father's family traced their descent, through the Orielton Owens, from Hwfa ap Cynddelw.) It is not known how long Owen's father remained in Llanfihangel. The Montgomeryshire historian E.R. Morris noted he had a peripatetic engineering career throughout Wales and Shropshire.

Following an education at Monmouth Grammar School, the younger Jacob Owen was apprenticed to the English canal engineer William Underhill, who was occupied on canal works in Staffordshire.

Owen's shift from civil engineer, the profession of his father, to architect was by no means guaranteed. After his apprenticeship, Owen moved south to London where he appears to have worked for the surveyor, Thomas Bush. The architectural historian Frederick O'Dwyer suggests that through Bush's military connections, Owen made the next important move in his career to the Royal Engineers department in the Board of Ordnance where, in 1805, he was appointed to the role of full clerk of works.

=== Private practice in England ===
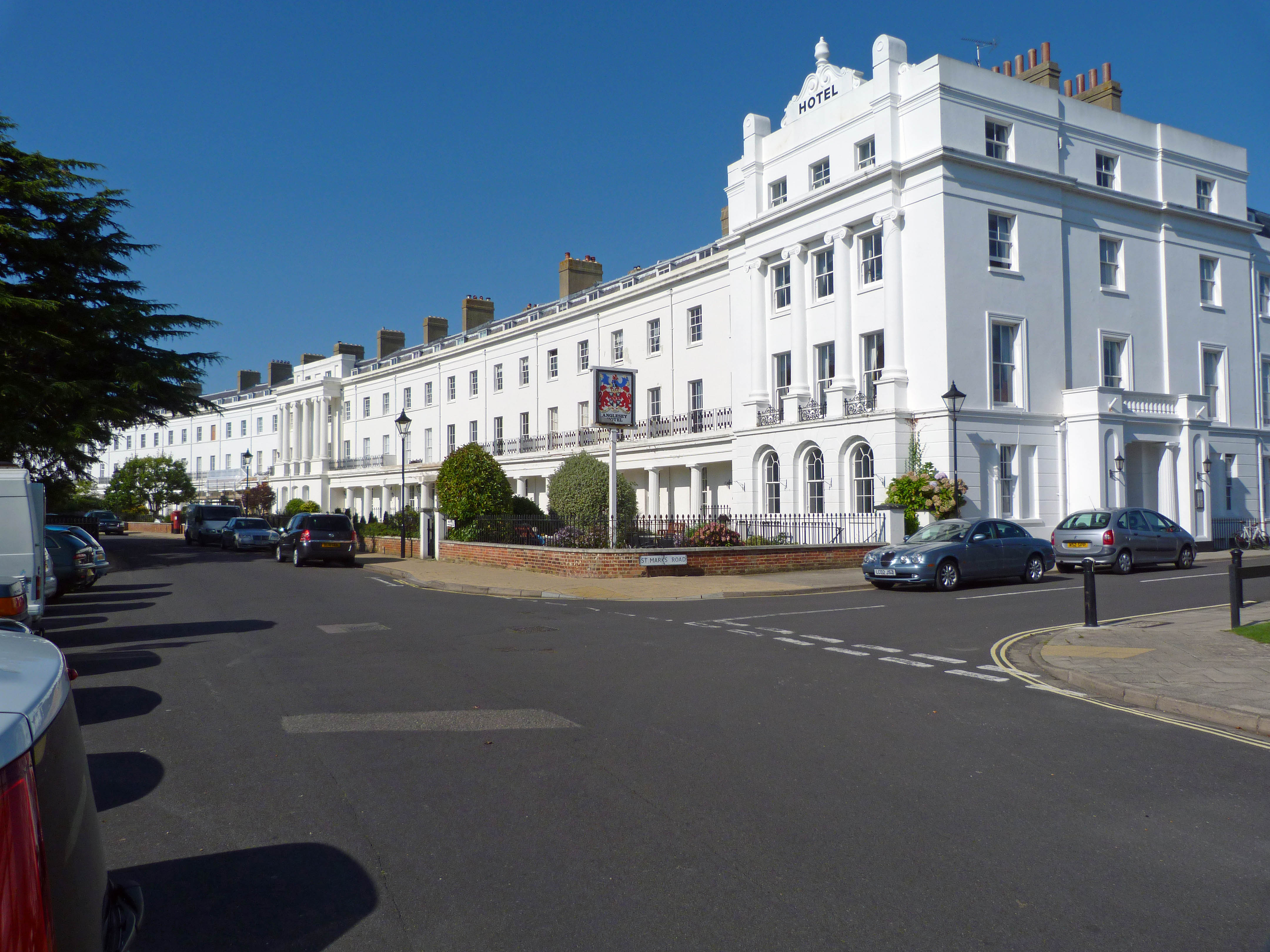
The Crescent Terraces and Anglesey Hotel, Crescent Road Gosport attributed to Jacob Owen and Thomas Ellis Owen

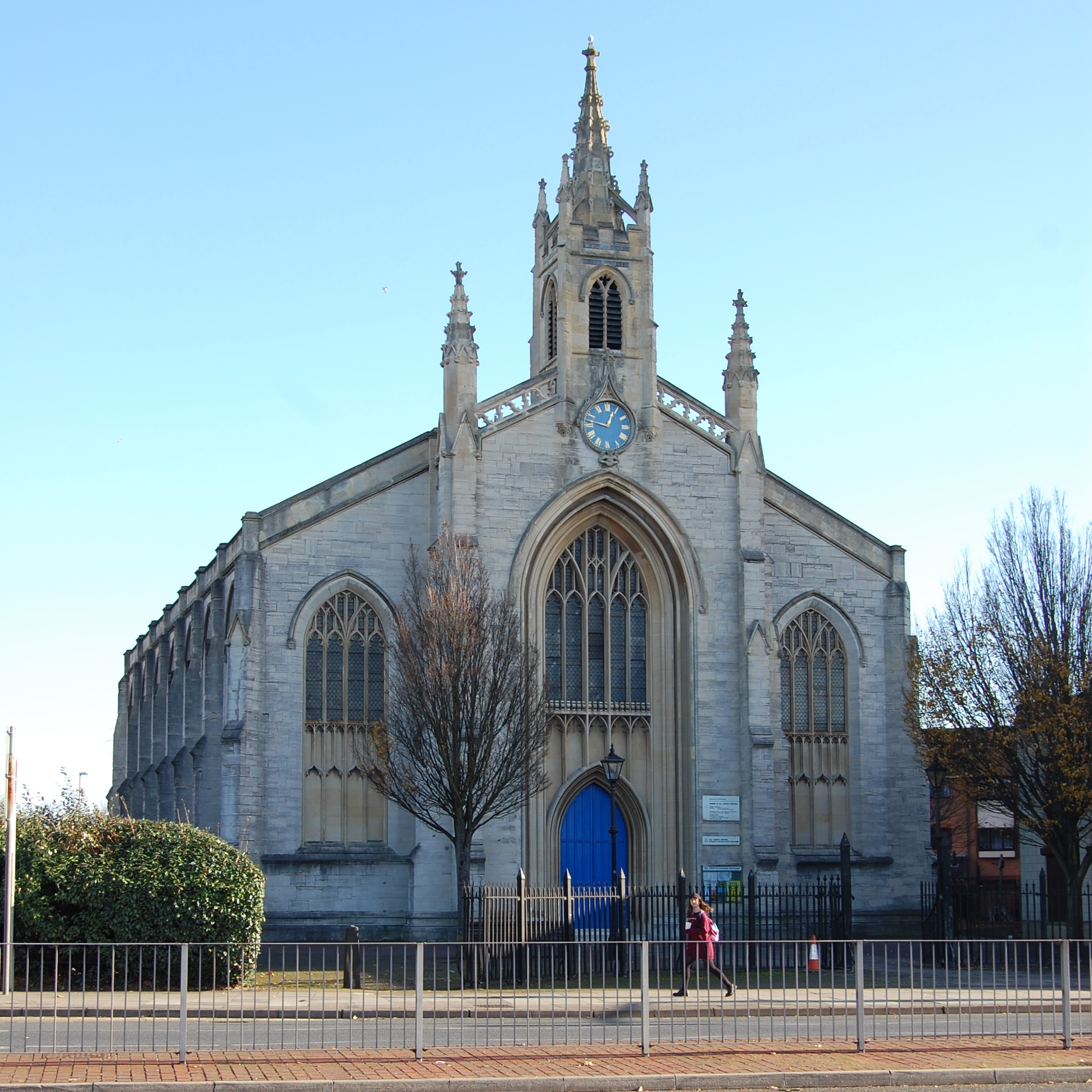
All Saints Church, Church Street, Landport, Portsmouth designed by Jacob Owen with assistance from Thomas Ellis Owen

There is little published on the breadth of Owen's work in England. No significant engineering work has been recorded against his name for the Board of Ordnance. Somewhat more is known of his private practice. Much of his output in England seems to have been ecclesiastical and civic architecture, based close to his centre of operations at the Portsmouth Naval Base. He is known to have collaborated with James Adams on the design of St Paul's School, Southsea, in 1825. The school buildings, which were described as "chaste and elegant" shortly after completion in 1828, were destroyed during the Second World War, along with the neighbouring St Paul's Church. In the late 1820s, he set up an architectural practice with Thomas Ellis Owen, Messrs Jacob Owen and Son. The Owens notable works include All Saint's Church, Portsea (1825–1828) and the Crescent Terraces and Anglesey Hotel, Gosport (1830). (Note: Some buildings designed by the practice, such as the Crescent, Gosport are attributed to in different sources to father and son respectively.)

Owen was actively involved in the Church Building Commission from the 1820s, both as an architect and as a committee member of the Hampshire branch. A number of church buildings attributed to Owen, including Church of the Holy Trinity, West Street, Fareham (1834–1837); Former United Reformed Church, West Street, Fareham (1836); the Church of St Francis, Funtley Hill, Farnham (1836); and St John the Baptist, Rowlands Castle (1837) were completed following his departure for Ireland, suggesting that he kept up his English practice for several years after leaving Portsmouth.

=== Royal Engineers and departure for Ireland ===
Over the first third of the nineteenth century, Owen rose to prominence in the Board of Ordnance, in part through his close relationship with John Fox Burgoyne. Owen and Burgoyne's association likely began in the 1820s, when Owen took up the role of Chief Surveyor to the Royal Engineers at Portsmouth, then under Burgoyne's command. In 1831, Burgoyne was appointed chairman of the Board of Public Works in Ireland. Existing arrangements between the engineering and architectural divisions of the board were not viewed favorably by Burgoyne and his commissioners. Previously the roles of architect and engineer had been divided between two officeholders, but a reformist impulse amongst the new commissioners and the death of the chief engineer, John Killaly, presented the opportunity to combine the roles. Burgoyne expressed his view that Owen's 'abilities and integrity' made him an ideal candidate for the role of principal engineer and architect in the Board of Public Works, based in Dublin. Beginning in 1832, Owen held the appointment for 24 years. Owen's younger brother, John, also made the move to Dublin in the 1830s, becoming clerk of works and architect in the Royal Engineers in the Ordnance Civil Branch. It appears that John's career was more closely tied to Burgoyne as he returned to England at the completion of Burgoyne's tenure, becoming surveyor to Burgoyne in his later role as Inspector General of Fortifications.

=== Career in Ireland ===
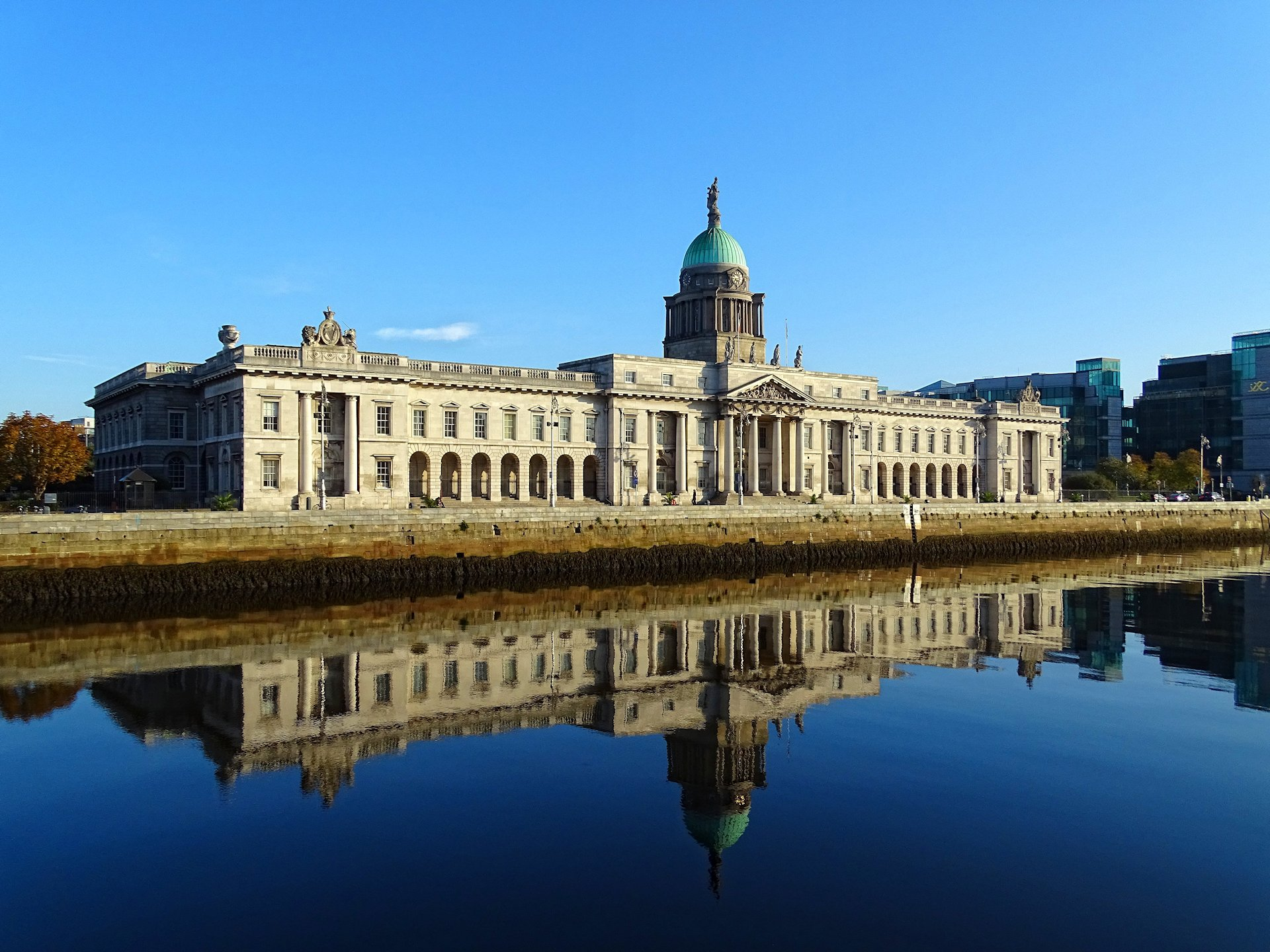
Owen's offices in Dublin were located in The Custom House.

Owen's architectural work in Ireland is generally, though not exclusively, associated with the Board of Public Works. Owen proved himself an industrious and capable leader in his appointment to the newly formed board of Public Works in Ireland. Burgoyne reflected in 1835 that Owen was 'the most able man for the situation I ever met in my life.' Owen's works for the board include the Carriage and Stable block, Dublin Castle (1834), Arbour Hill Prison, Dublin (1835), the Garda Headquarters, Phoenix Park (1842), Talbot House (formerly the Female Teacher Training School) (1842), and the Criminal Lunatic Asylum, Dundrum (1850) among others.

For much of his career, Owen had maintained a private architectural practice. He continued to pick up independent private commissions and work from other Crown departments for his first fourteen years in Ireland, thus expanding his mark on the landscape of civic architecture in Ireland. This can be seen in his design for St Patrick's Church, Dalkey (1839-1843) and his work for the National Education Commission on Tyrone House (1835) and the Model Infant School (1842). O'Dwyer has argued that the Great Famine and subsequent reorganization of public works finally led Treasury to put an end to Owen's free enterprise. However, the increased pressure on the Board's architectural staff, which had led Owen to commission outside architects for some of the Board's major building projects, was a more immediate factor in play. In lieu of his private practice work, his salary was increased by 25 per cent to £1,000.

As the work of the board increased, Owen expanded his role as administrator, and drew on the talents of non-board architects. The result of his efforts can be seen in Augustus Pugin's design of St Patrick's College, Maynooth, and in his collaboration with Decimus Burton at Phoenix Park. One of his greatest impressions on the history of nineteenth Irish architecture can be seen in his supervision of the design of Queen's College at Belfast, Cork and Galway undertaken by Charles Lanyon, Thomas Deane, and John Benjamin Keane respectively.

=== Reputation for nepotism ===
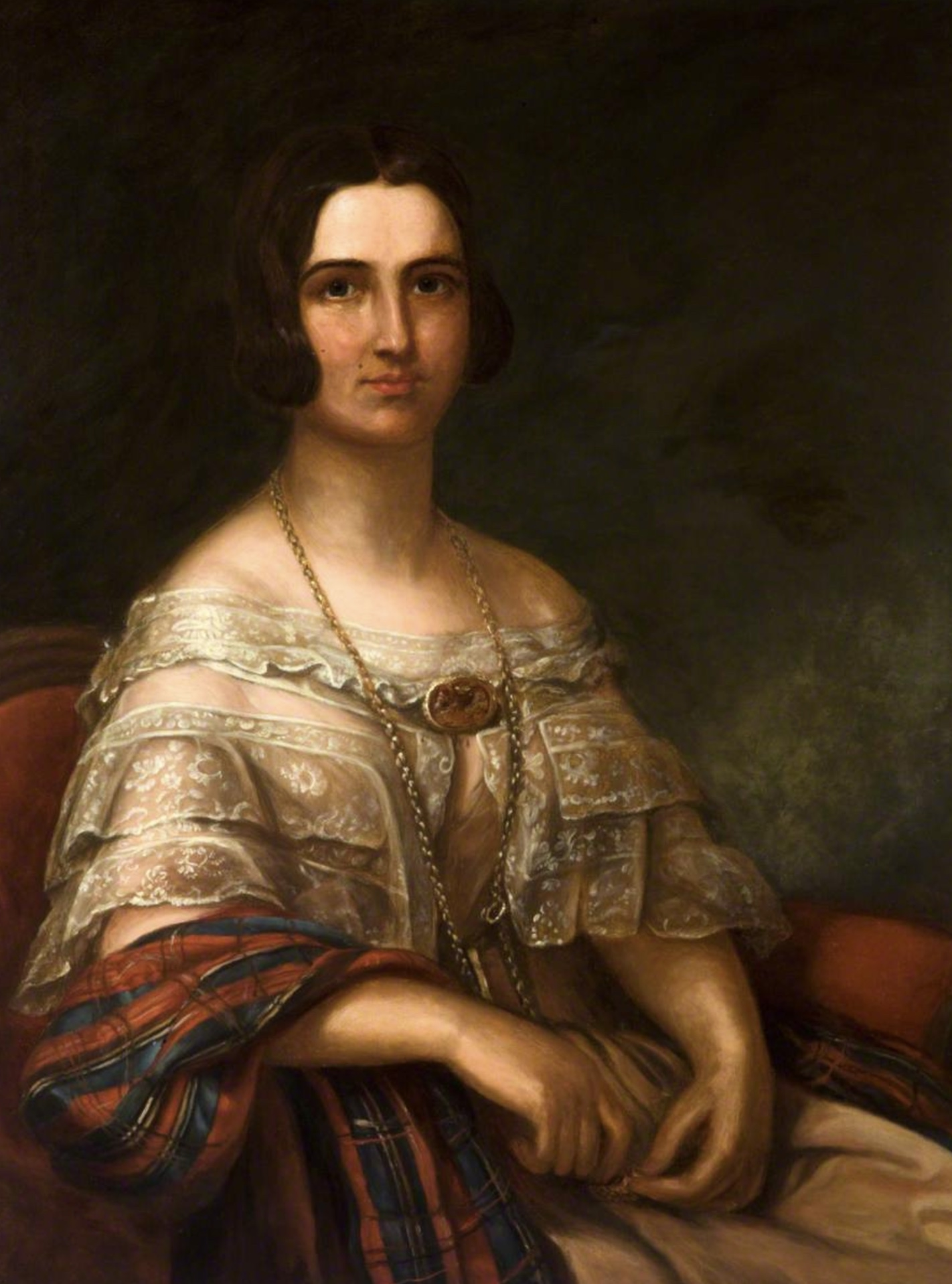
Elizabeth Helen Owen (later Lady Lanyon), philanthropist, who married her father’s apprentice, Charles Lanyon in 1837

On arriving in Ireland, Owen brought with him a considerable family entourage. Owen had married Mary Underhill, the daughter of his former master William Underhill, by whom he had seventeen children, including the naval architect Jeremiah Owen, the theologian Joseph Butterworth Owen and the architects Thomas Ellis Owen, James Higgins Owen, William Henshaw Owen, and Henry Higgins Owen. According to O'Dwyer, Owen set about 'founding a dynasty that would dominate the new board of public works for the first sixty years of its existence.' Four of his sons either won commissions or held posts on the board, while the marriages of architects Charles Lanyon and Frederick Villiers Clarendon into the Owen family increased his sphere of influence in Ireland (both architects were successful in winning major public works commissions and securing office on the board). Both Lanyon and James Higgins Owen served as presidents of the Royal Institute of the Architects of Ireland.

Contemporaries perceived a 'dynasty in the making.' Accusations relating to the appointment of his children and apprentices as county surveyors followed but no misconduct was found. Called before a parliamentary select committee to assess Owen's examinations for vacancies on the Board, Burgoyne was asked whether Owen was a "gentleman of considerable experience", to which he responded "perhaps as much as any man I ever met with." His son, James Higgins Owen, succeeded his post. Networks of family ties were critical to Owen's power but they were also a subject of some political sensitivity. His claim that his family were predominantly Whigs was untrue. In the 1830s his eldest son Jeremiah Owen campaigned publicly against Whig policy in the Navy; from the 1830s his second eldest Thomas Ellis Owen ran as a Tory candidate in Portsmouth, twice becoming mayor; from the 1840s, his third eldest son, Joseph Butterworth Owen was publicly connected with leading Conservative politicians including Lord Shaftsbury; and his son-in-law Charles Lanyon was Conservative MP for Belfast in the 1860s. Owen's departure from Ireland coincided with the Fenian Rising of 1867. The year before Joseph Butterworth Owen wrote in support of the suspension of habeas corpus for Fenians.

=== Personality, power and politics ===
Moves against Owen were made within the first years of his appointment. In 1837, Decimus Burton had suggested building villas adjacent to Phoenix Park, reflecting the design of London's Regent's Park. Owen tendered for these blocks, but the plans soon became mired in controversy. In June 1838, a pseudonymous letter was sent to the Lord Lieutenant, the Earl of Mulgrave, accusing Owen and those who worked with him of financial misconduct, and for being "brother conservatives and Orangemen." Owen denied these accusations, pointing to the fact that he had never expressed political views in Ireland, that members of his family supported the Whigs, and that he regretted to report "of all, my greatest sin is that of being an Englishman." (Note: The accusations, and Owen's apologia for his Englishness, placed him in the centre of what cultural historian Dana Arnold called, in reference to Burton and Owen's efforts in Dublin, the debate over 'the export, adoption and creation of new identities in the British colonial world.')

Owen was a polarising figure, making contemporary assessments of his personality hard to reconcile. According to Frederick O'Dwyer, 'His brusque manner, family favouritism, and dominance of Irish public works architecture brought him enemies.' The architect Robert Young's assessment of him as 'vulgar and unmannerly' contrasted diametrically with the writer Thomas Jackson's description of 'the generous and eloquent Owen.'

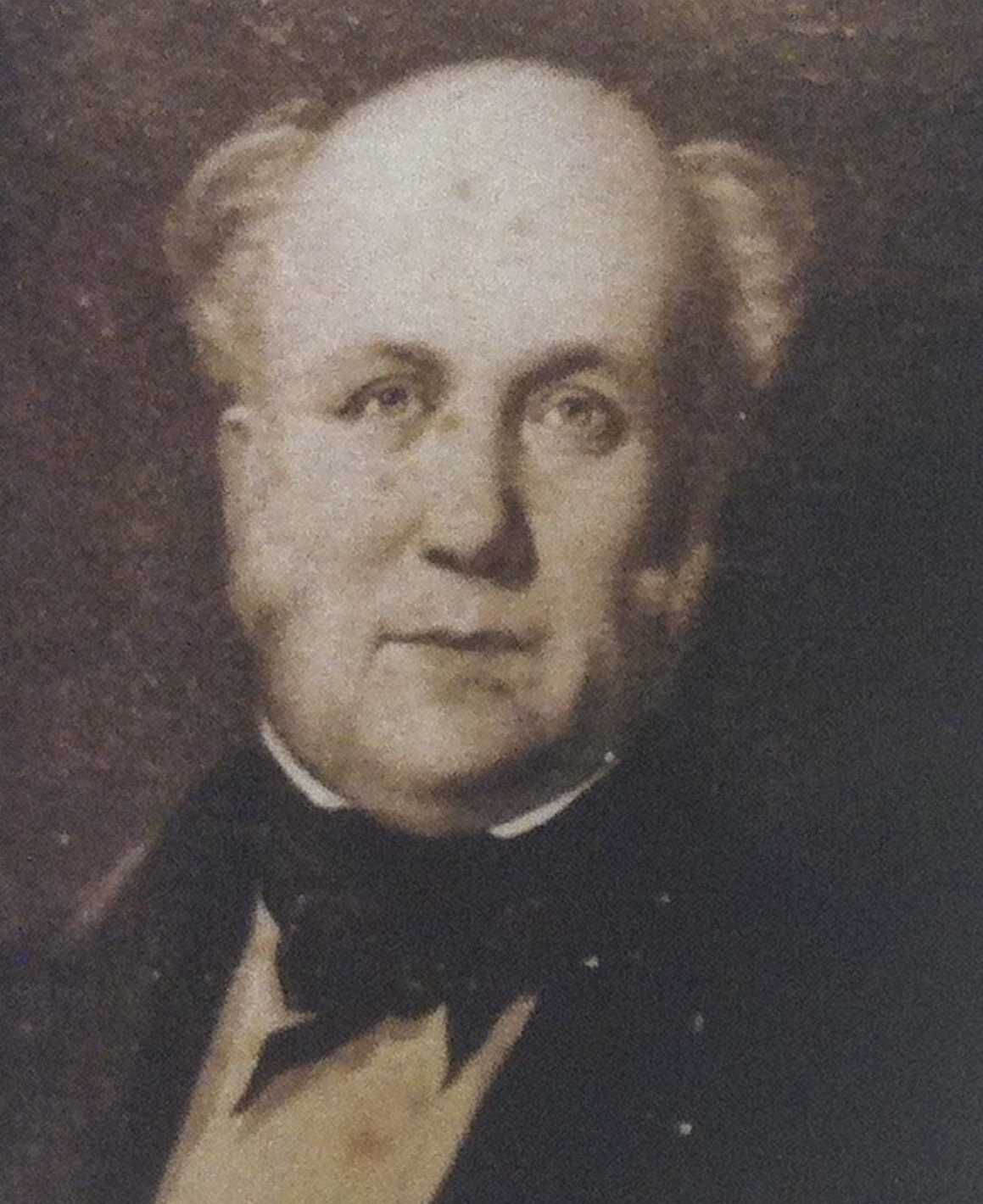
Jacob Owen in his later years

Desmond McCabe has argued that Owen's 'robust and controlling temperament in the conduct of public office' has often distracted historians' attention from assessment of his work. Nevertheless, as historian John Graby has suggested, Owen's public character was in part responsible for his ability to strongly advocate for the professionalisation of architecture in Ireland. 'Strong willed and oblivious to criticism, character traits that had attracted a certain amount of odium and professional jealousy during his term in office as government architect, could now be seen' in the campaign to found the Royal Institute of the Architects of Ireland "as a bonus in the fight to re-establish the profession." Owen served as vice-president of the Royal Institute of the Architects of Ireland (RIAI), the Royal Zoological Society of Ireland, and the Institution of Civil Engineers of Ireland (ICEI), and was a council member of the Geological Society of Dublin. He became an elected member of the Royal Irish Academy in 1838. He wielded his power in Irish public life with determined political calculation. While he was accused of harbouring conservative prejudices, he never entered into political debate.

Despite his domineering personality in so many aspects of public life, it was perhaps Owen's own political silence, in contrast to so many members of his family, that played in his favour during challenges to his public office.

=== Private life ===
Owen married Mary Underhill (1781–1858) in 1798. Mary was the mother of his seventeen children, thirteen of whom survived to adulthood. Despite the evident favoritism Owen exhibited towards his children in his professional life, he placed high demands on them as a father. Owen's family members described his "upright, unbending, and sincere" character, yet also recalled his exacting standards. Failing to make the Tripos list at Cambridge University, Joseph Butterworth Owen recalled "disappointing the high expectations of his family."

Owen was raised in the Anglican faith, his father having acted for a time as churchwarden at St Chad's Church, Shrewsbury, and later in life he became a committed Wesleyan Methodist. In spite of the Plan of Pacification in 1795, which many scholars see as marking the formal separation of Methodists from the Church of England, Owen seems to have cleaved to Wesley's earlier belief that Methodists should remain within the Anglican church. His sons Jeremiah and Thomas Ellis were both baptised in the Anglican church of St Anne and St Agnes, London, (Note: St Anne and St Agnes held a special place in the history of English Methodism as John Wesley had twice preached there in the 1730s.) and Owen was one of the founders of St Paul's School, an Anglican grammar school in Southsea, to which he sent his third son Joseph. Yet from at least the start of the nineteenth century, he was also an active Methodist. (Note: Owen was recorded as a trustee of the Bilston Wesleyan Methodist Chapel in Staffordshire along with his father-in-law William Underhill in January 1801.) In this, Owen moved in the high Wesleyan tradition which sought to maintain Methodism's historic affinity with the Church of England. Despite holding what had become a somewhat unorthodox position, Owen recalled his attendance at the Wesleyan Methodist Conference in London in 1810; and his friendships with Joseph Butterworth, Thomas Jackson, Robert Newton and Joseph Benson linked him with the first generation of English Methodist leaders after John Wesley's death. Once in Dublin, he and Mary opened their home to visiting Methodist preachers from England.

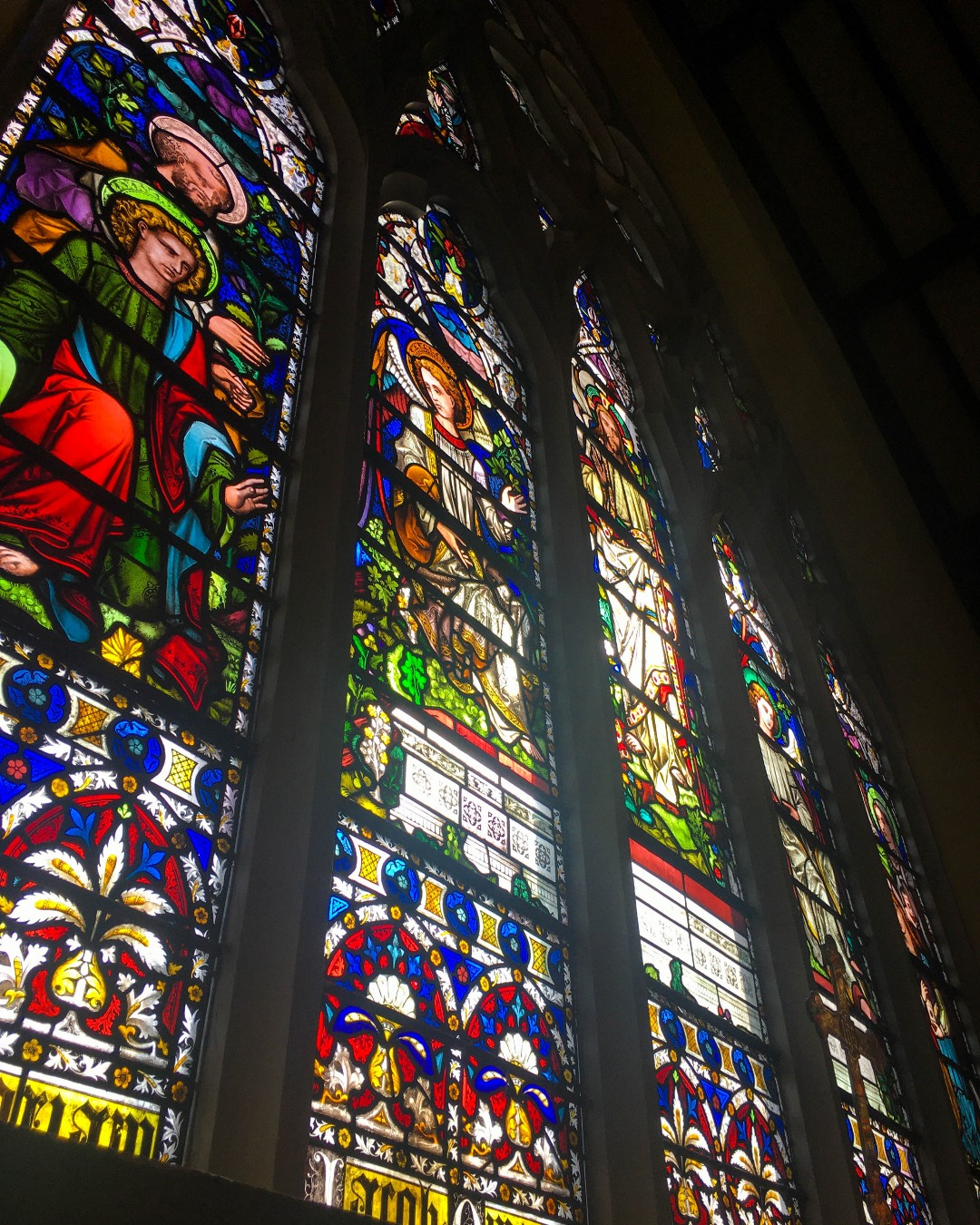
Great East Window of St Jude’s commemorating Jacob Owen

For much of his life in Dublin, he lived at 2 Mountjoy Square West. After Mary's death in 1858, he married Elizabeth Donnet Fry (née Louder; c. 1792 – 1870), widow of Captain John Fry, veteran of the Peninsular War and the Battle of Waterloo.

Owen's commitments in Ireland and his well-established family connections kept him in Dublin for over a decade after his retirement from public service. On retirement he reflected that "the day is not long enough for what I find necessary to do, now that I am supposed to do nothing." He found time to take up French and music lessons, and to entertain large numbers of family and friends for dinner almost every evening. In 1864, he founded the Irish Civil Service Building Society with his son James Higgins Owen, and continued to play an active role in the RIAI. During the height of the Fenian Rising in 1867, Owen left Ireland for Southsea, which had been developed as a resort town by his second eldest son, Thomas Ellis Owen.

Owen died in 1870 at Toll End, Staffordshire, home of his daughter and her physician husband. His wife Elizabeth had predeceased him by five months. His lasting connection to Ireland was signalled by the choice of his burial place at Mount Jerome Cemetery. Upon his death, the RIAI stated that he "brought a practical and vigorous intellect to bear upon the amazing professional events of the earlier half of this century; and in his public career in this country commanded respect by his administrative ability and unbending honesty of character." Owen was memorialised with the Great East Window of St Jude's, Southsea, a church designed by Thomas Ellis Owen.

== Significant buildings ==
=== Áras an Uachtaráin ===
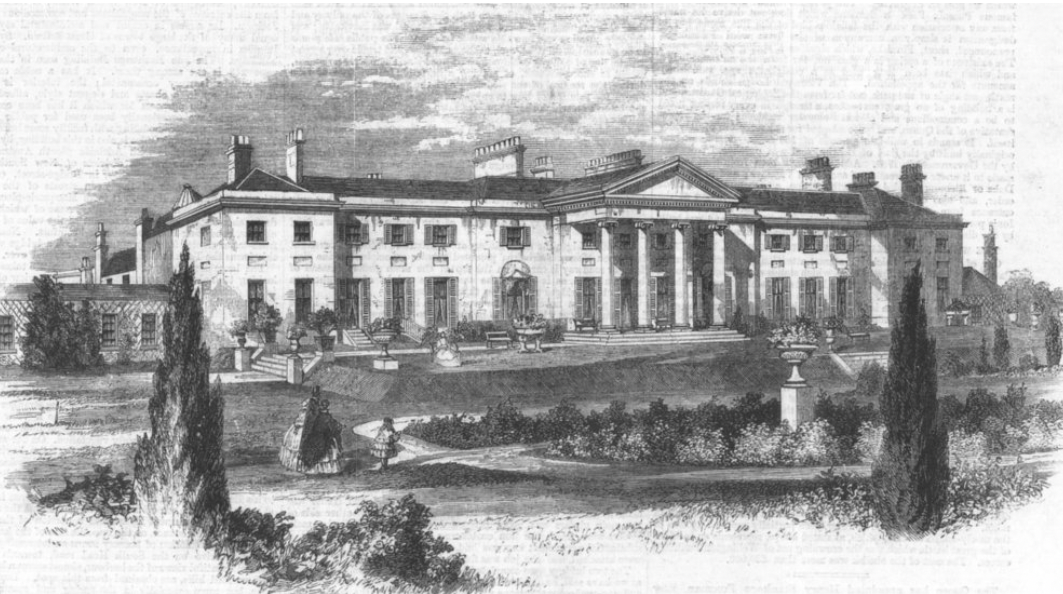
Vice-Regal Lodge, Phoenix Park, showing Owen's extensions

Owen was responsible for major extensions to Áras an Uachtaráin in the 1840s and 1850s when it served as the Viceregal Lodge. This work included the designs for the state dining room and the addition of the East Wing in time for the first state visit of Queen Victoria in 1849. Owen designed the subsequent extension for the West Wing, giving the Lodge, previously described as "nothing more than a neat, plain brick building", a comprehensive series of reception and state rooms, including a ballroom, and An Grianán, currently used as the private drawing room of the President of the Republic of Ireland.

Owen also collaborated on the surrounding grounds of Phoenix Park with Decimus Burton. Despite an anticipation of professional rivalry, John McCullen has observed that an 'excellent working relationship prevailed.' Owen was responsible for the renovation of the Islandbridge gate lodge, the cottage orné-style Bailiff's Lodge and submitted a number of designs for other park lodges ranging from Italianate, Tudor, Gothic, and Neo-classical.

=== Central Criminal Lunatic Asylum, Dundrum ===
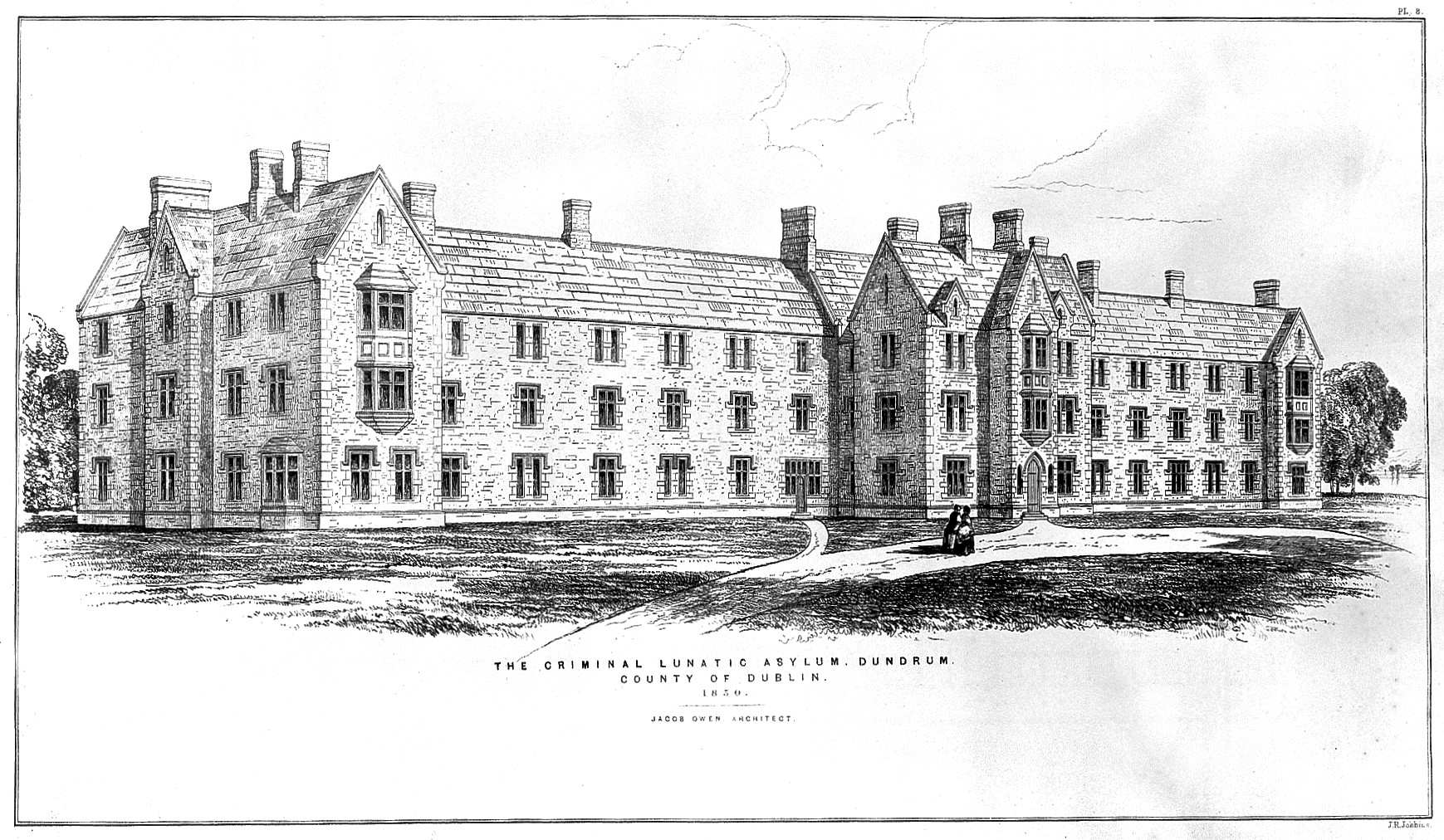
Jacob Owen’s design for the Criminal Lunatic Asylum, Dundrum, Dublin

A renewed interest in the history of mental health and asylums has concentrated attention on Owen's work on the Central Criminal Lunatic Asylum at Dundrum. Owen's design, providing asylum treatment for 80 men and 60 women, was built between 1847 and 1851. He had previous experience in prison design working with Joshua Jebb on Mountjoy Convict Prison, Dundrum. Viewed today, the building's Tudor exterior belies its contribution to developing theories of mental health and rehabilitation. Markus Reuber notes that Owen's design was "proof of the maturity of the Irish asylum planners" in the 1850s. Upon the asylum's completion in 1851, Owen described his brief, explaining that the arrangement of the building 'necessarily differ[s] very materially from those of an ordinary lunatic asylum, as it is necessary to provide for the treatment of patients in a state of convalescence, and against any attempt at escape in lucid intervals.' Reuber has elaborated stating that "Owen's plan was inspired by the ideas of Francis White and John Nugent, two doctors who held the posts of inspectors of lunacy in Ireland." As Reuber notes Owen further engaged with new theories of asylum and mental health treatment, consulting E.C. Kenny, superintendent of a temporary branch of the Richmond Asylum at Islandbridge in Dublin, who noted that the designs were "still open to modification in their detail", which allowed for alterations to therapeutic work rooms. On this necessity for flexibility in the facility's design in line with developments in theories of mental health, Owen explained that "Early English style was adopted [...] for its affording facilities for the alterations and additions that may be expected in process of time." For its time, the asylum was viewed in high regard in the treatment of mental disorder. Lord Shaftesbury saw its construction as a progressive move, arguing that "it proved that the disassociation of criminal and ordinary lunatics was beneficial."

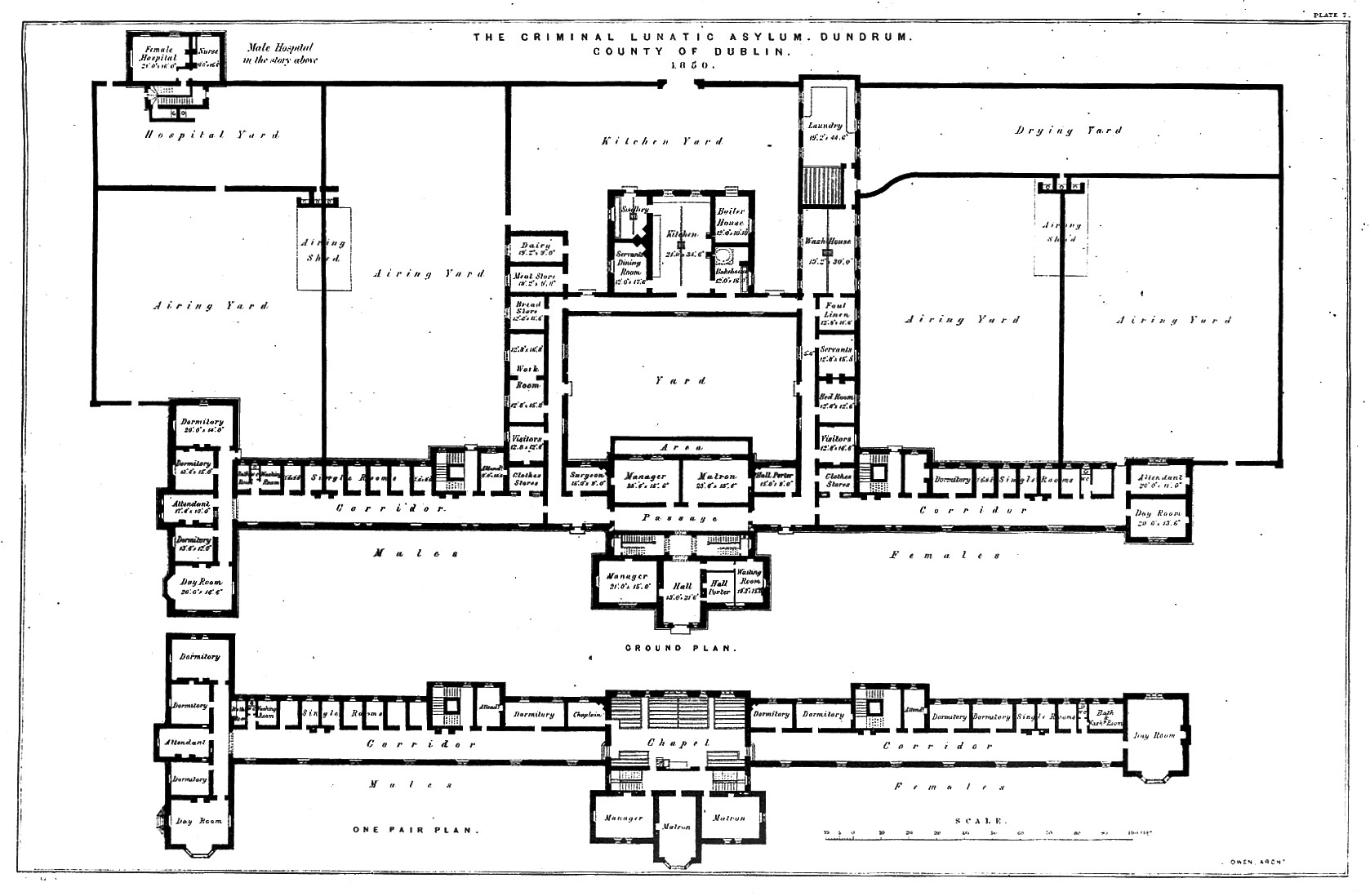
Owen's original floorplan for Criminal Lunatic Asylum

The National Inventory of Architectural Heritage's appraisal notes that the complex represents "an important component of the mid nineteenth-century built heritage of south County Dublin with the architectural value of the composition, one following the cellular model, confirmed by such attributes as the near-symmetrical footprint centred on a Tudor Revival-detailed frontispiece; the construction in a rough cut deep blue limestone offset by silver-grey granite dressings not only demonstrating good quality workmanship, but also producing a sober two-tone palette; the diminishing in scale of the multipartite openings on each floor producing a graduated visual impression with the private apartments set aside for the governor defined by a polygonal oriel window; and the miniature gablets embellishing a high pitched multi-gabled roofline." Kathryn Burtinshaw and John Burt noted that the building's design centred on the moral condition of the patients: "Patients worked at their trades, read books and were provided with various activities. The use of restraint and seclusion was restricted to the most violent patients." A further extension to the asylum was made by Owen's grandson-in-law, Frederick Villiers Clarendon.

=== Chief Secretary's Lodge ===
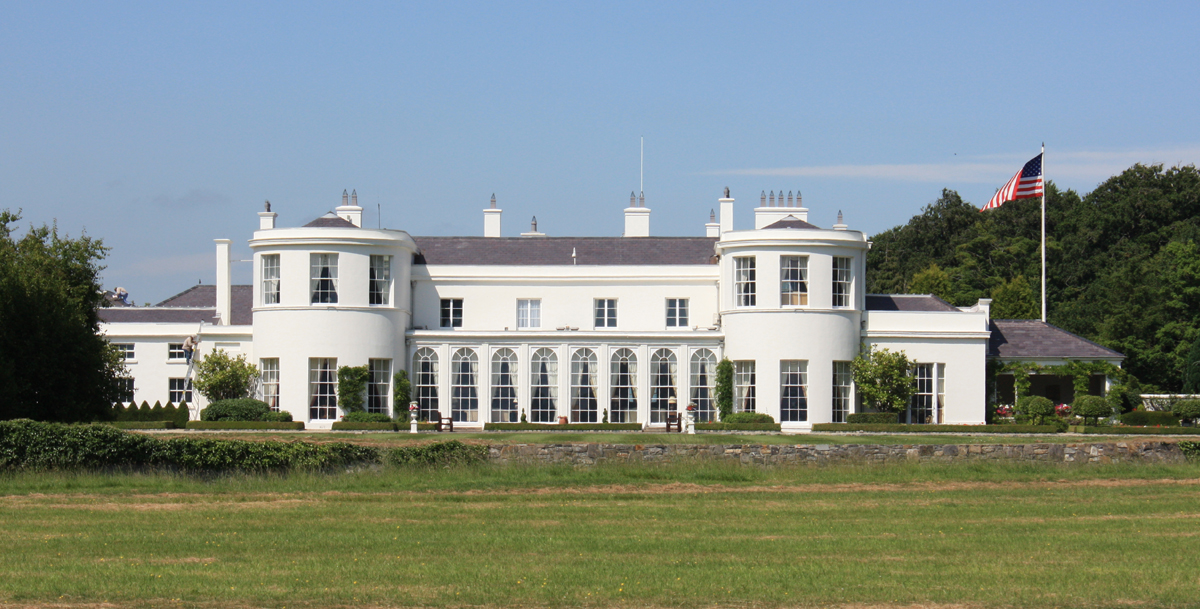
The garden range of the U.S. Ambassador's Residence in Ireland designed by Jacob Owen in 1845

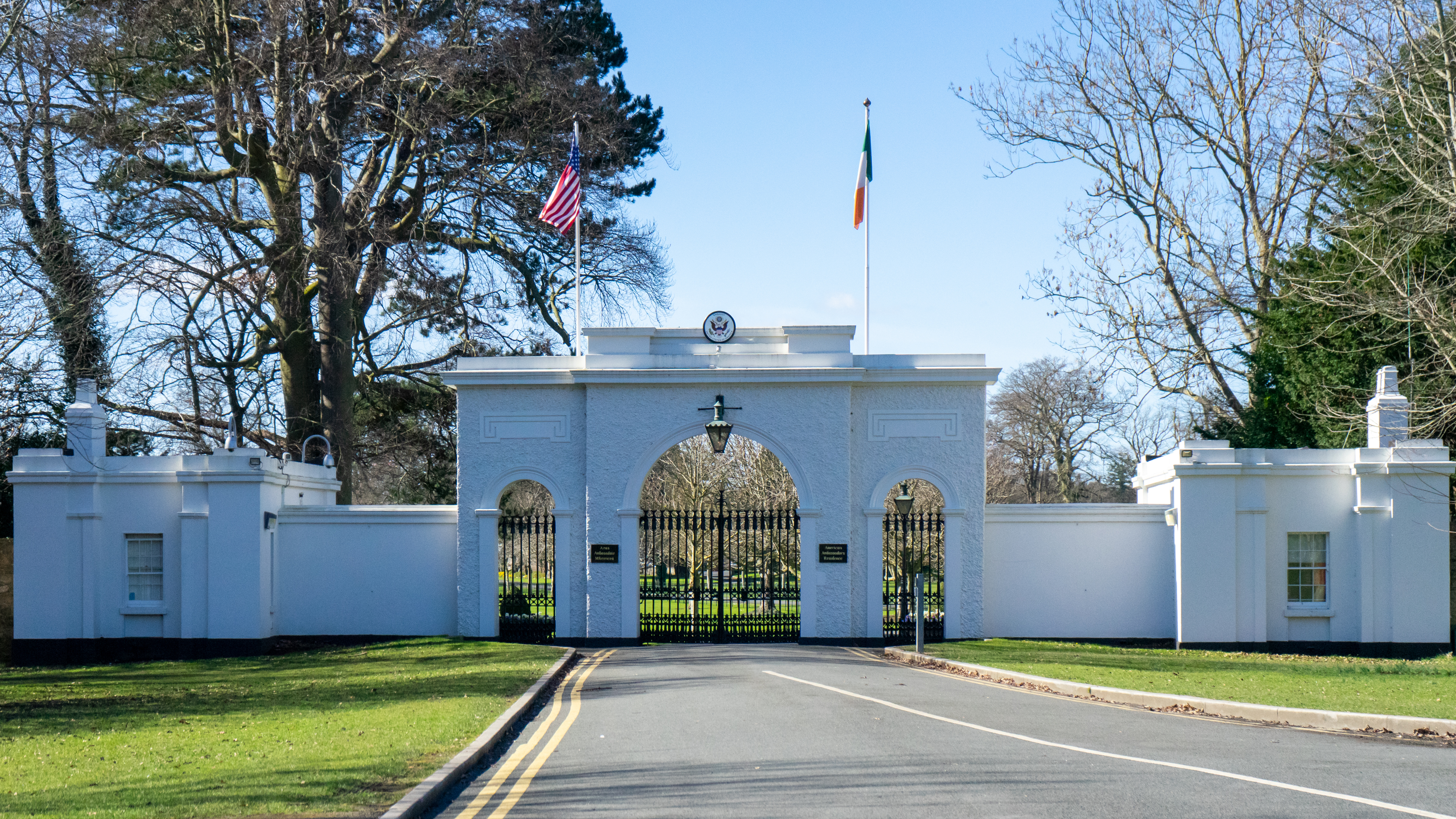
Owen's Entrance Gate to the Chief Secretary's Lodge

As with Owen's redesign of the Vice-Regal Lodge, the redesign of the Chief Secretary's Lodge in the 1840s was part of Owen's broader vision for the redesign of Phoenix Park. The original lodge, built in 1776, was described by architectural historian Christine Casey as a 'rectangular box' with a single, one-storey bay and arcade added in 1835. Owen's remodeling, including the creation of symmetrical double storied bows, separated by an eight bay arcaded and glazed range was designed to integrate with Burton's new park landscaping in 1845. As with his work on the Vice-Regal Lodge, the extended Chief Secretary's Lodge allowed Owen to extensively redesign the interior including the ballroom and dining room, each housed in bows flanking two drawingrooms.

Owen's design for the Entrance Gate to the Lodge was also completed in 1845. As with many of his smaller Phoenix Park lodge buildings, including his 1840 Deer-Keeper's Lodge and Island Bridge Gate Lodge, the Entrance Gate was designed in conversation with Burton's naturalistic landscaping for Phoenix Park. Since the 1920s, both the Entrance Gate and the Chief Secretary's Lodge have been absorbed into the U.S. Ambassador's Residency in Ireland.

=== Dublin Castle ===
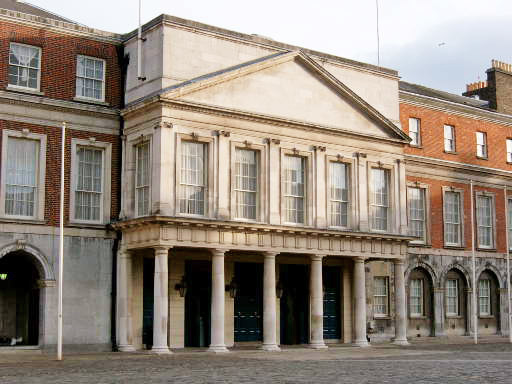
Owen's State apartment entrance Dublin Castle

Owen's modernisation of Dublin Castle included significant extensions to interior and exterior of the castle complex. His mark on the building's interior included updating and enlarging the state rooms, which included altering the Presence Chamber designed by the former surveyor general Arthur Jones-Nevill and designing the extension for the new Throne Room. Owen created the State Drawing Room out of a series of smaller late 17th-century State Apartments which had previously been modified by Jones-Nevill in the 18th century. He combined three of these rooms to form the new seven-bay State Drawing Room with a screen of Corinthian columns at the eastern end. Subsequent expansion of the state rooms were in keeping with his opening of the castle's former warren of rooms.

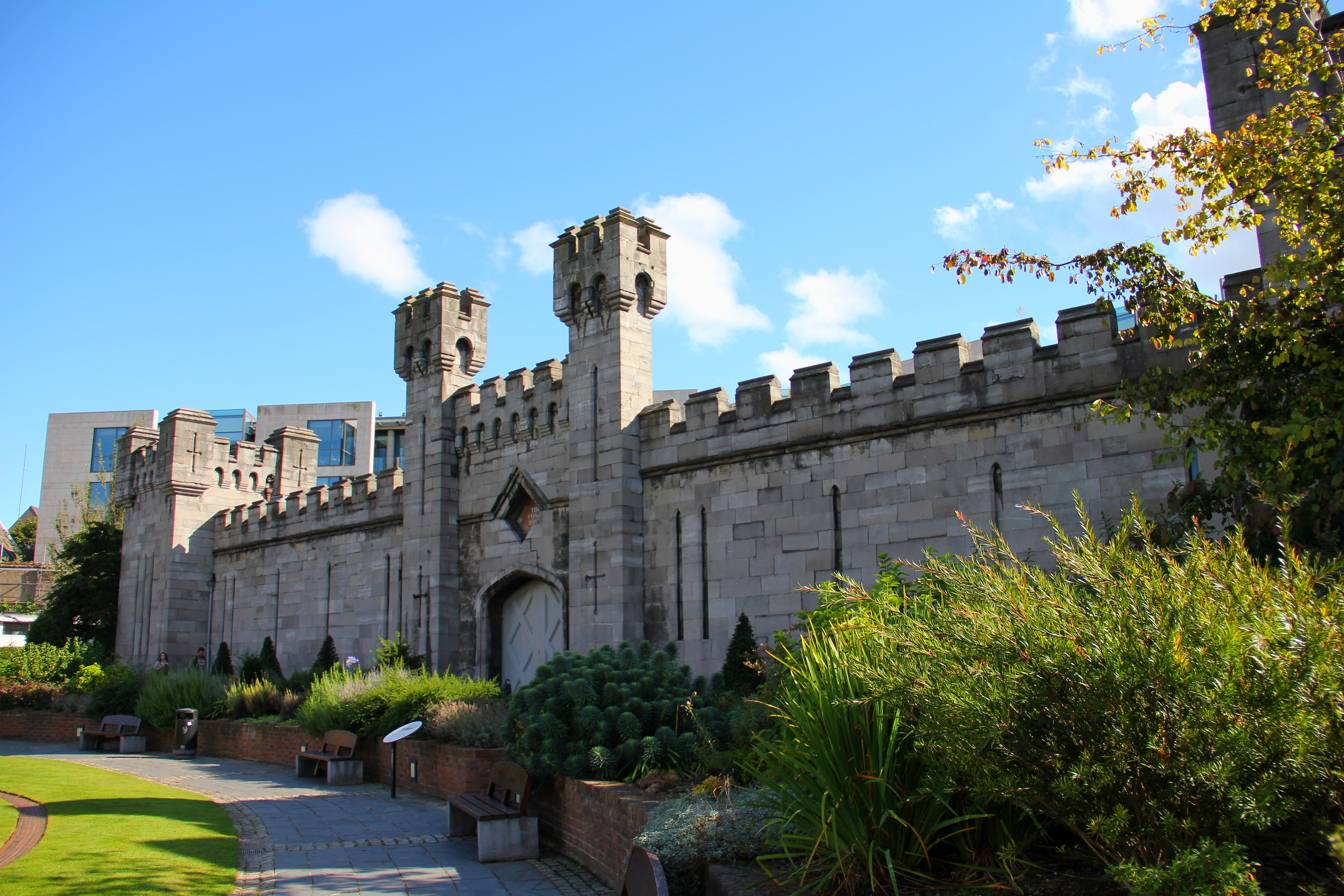
The Dublin Castle Coach House, designed by Jacob Owen and completed in 1834

Owen's reconfiguration and redesign included the reconstruction of the formal staircase and the commissioning of master artisans including papier-mâché artist Charles Frederick Bielefeld who had previously worked on St James's Palace. During her 1849 visit, Queen Victoria commented on Owen's redesign that "Everything here is as at St. James's Levée. The staircase and the Throne-room quite like a palace."

These internal changes were part of the Countess and the Earl of Musgrave's request to redesign the castle to receive state visitors. Designs attributed to Owen for a grandiose entrance including a viewing platform were drawn up in 1837–8. But in early 1838, these designs were rejected. A scaled down compromise was reached resulting in what architectural historians have called an "undistinguished" and "somewhat undersized" entrance.

Owen also contributed to the castle with his design of the coach-house, completed in 1834; the Cavalry Guard House (1837); modernisation of the Treasury building (1837–1838); the Constabulary Barracks (1838); and an extension to the Chief Secretary's Office (1840–1841).

=== Four Courts ===
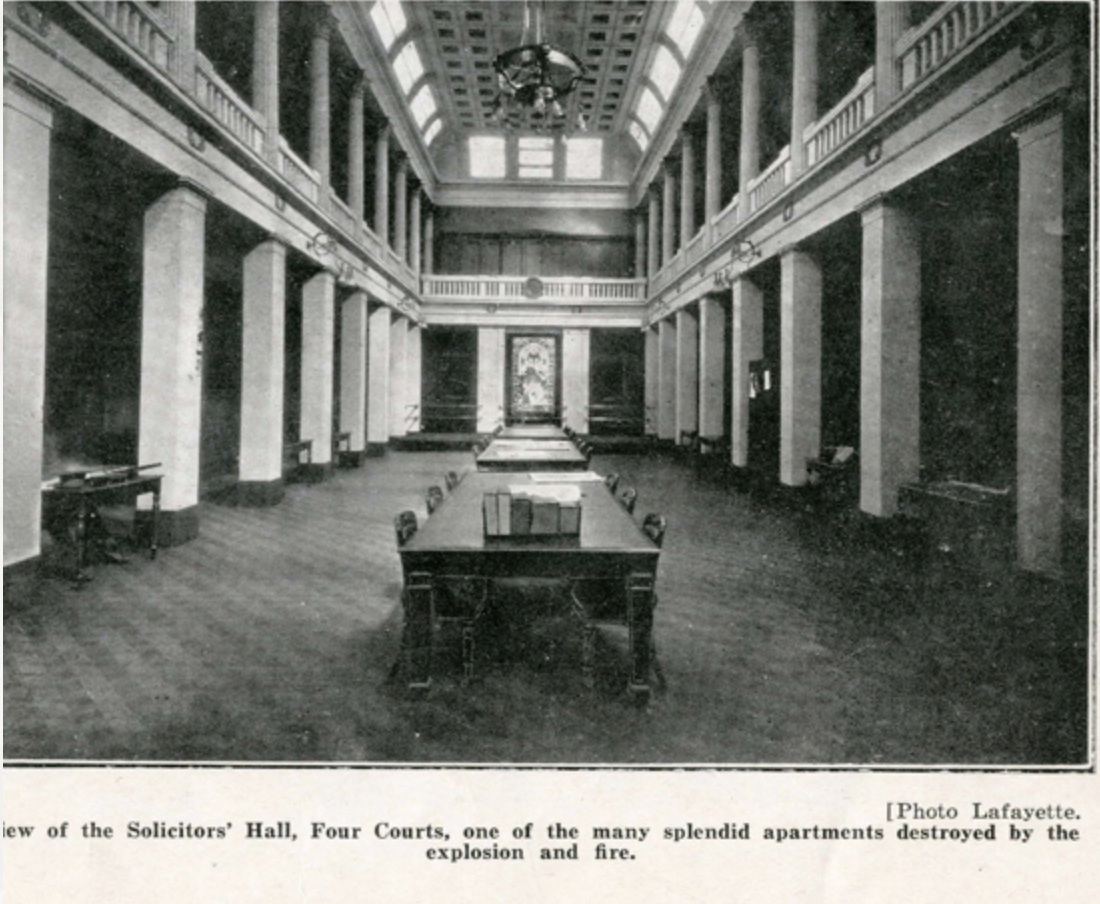
Solicitors' Hall, Four Courts

Owen's work on the Four Courts began within a few years of his arrival in Ireland. His first intervention was the addition of the galleried, top-lit law library in 1835, designed in the Greek revival style. Two years later, at the northern edge of the central axis, Owen designed a Greek revival façade which occupies the rear part of the solicitors' hall and coffee room. Architectural historian Christine Casey called it "the most distinguished and best preserved of the nineteenth century buildings". As part of the post-1922 reconstruction of the Four Courts, the decision was made to permanently rehouse the Law Library in the solicitors' hall.

In 1858, Owen began work to replace the Encumbered Estates Court with a new Landed Estates Court in the Four Courts complex. The new premises took two years to build. Owen's design was described in newspaper reporting upon its completion in 1860 as "a continuation of the range extending in the westerly direction from the pile known as the Benchers Building in suite with the insolvency and bankruptcy courts at the eastern side of the coffee room and Solicitors' Chambers," and "a most useful and creditable work in a solid, graceful and unpretentious style, presenting an appearance both chaste and imposing, and harmonising perfectly with the older portions of the rear extension."

=== Garda Headquarters, Dublin ===
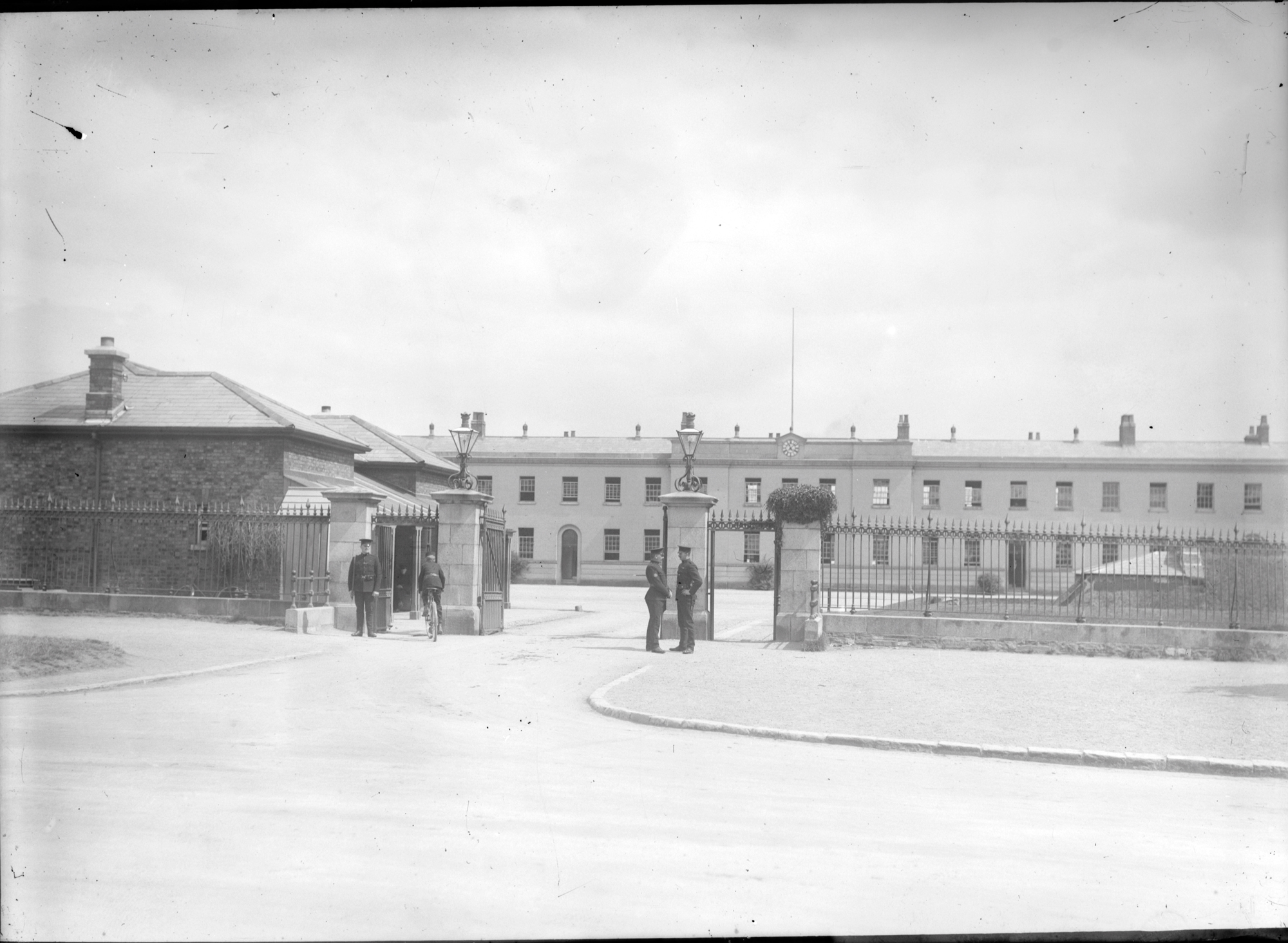
Garda Headquarters in the Phoenix Park, with original rendered exterior

In 1836, parliament passed legislation centralising policing in Ireland. A new central police training depot for Ireland was proposed for the Phoenix Park location. By 1839, Owen had completed the design for the new depot, which were subsequently sent to London for approval. As a result of this process, minor alterations were made to the boundaries of the depot to create a curved road around the railed enclosure.

Owen's original building design, executed over 1840 to 1842, consisted of three two storey ranges that centred on the central parade ground. Architectural historian Christine Casey notes that these are "simply expressed, parapeted with sash windows, round-headed doors and shallow projections to the centre and ends. Originally rendered, they have recently been stripped back to the limestone rubble, which undermines the elegant planar manipulation of Owen's façades."Photography from the late nineteenth and early twentieth century show the front façade facing onto the parade grounds dressed as Casey describes but also reveals the rear of the building were undressed as they remain today.

Casey notes that "[t]he police depot at Phoenix Park resembles a regency boarding school as much as a police barracks", perhaps, in part due to the fact that Owen was engaged at the time in work for the Department of Education, including Talbot House and the Infant Model School. These buildings, nevertheless, show the diversity of Owen's architectural expression. Surprisingly there is no NIAH entry for this building, perhaps in part due to restrictions placed on assessing the interior of the building by the Garda, as described by Casey in her assessment.

=== The Infant Model School and Tyrone House, Dublin ===
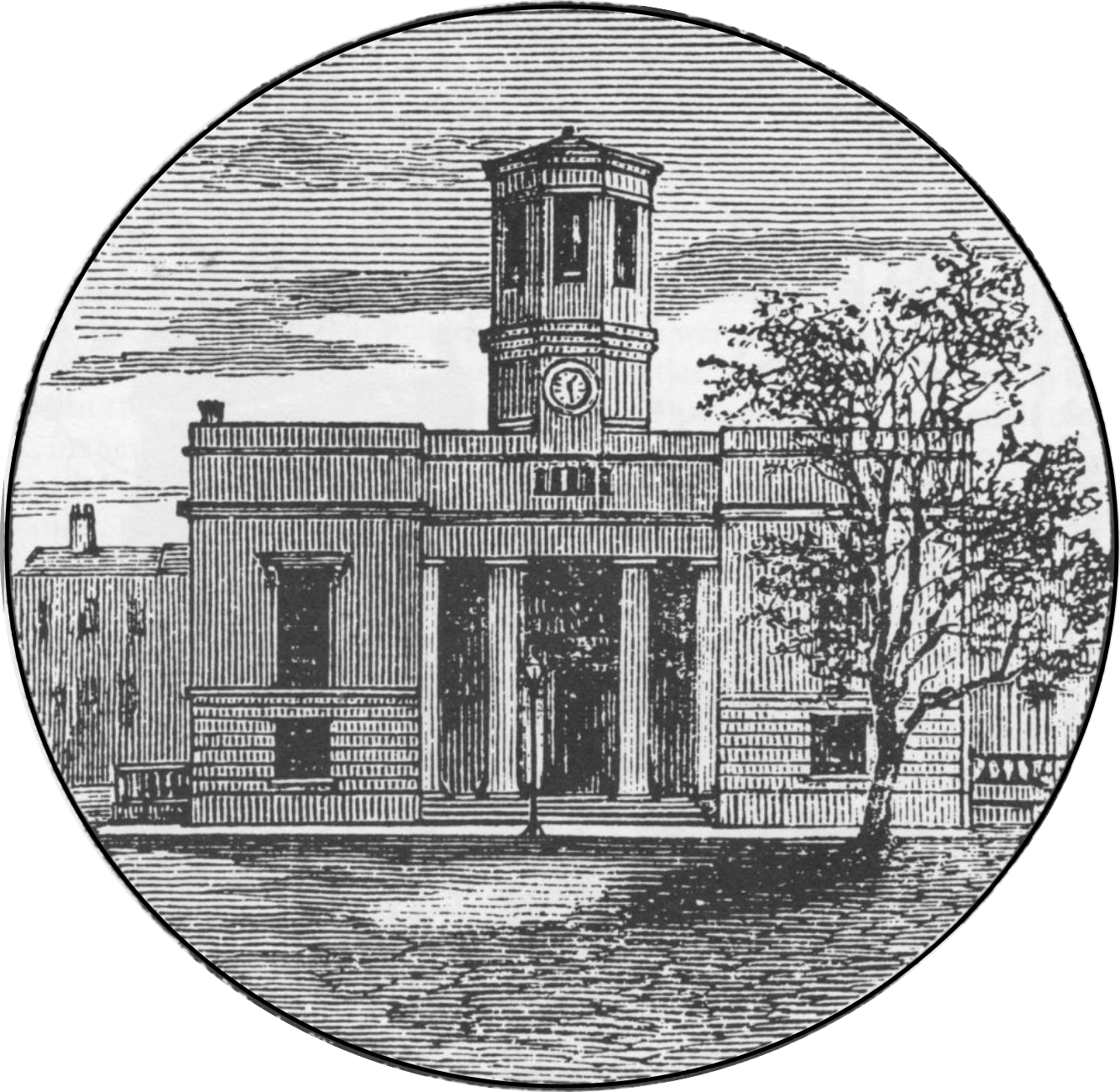
The Infant Model School, with Owen's original clock tower

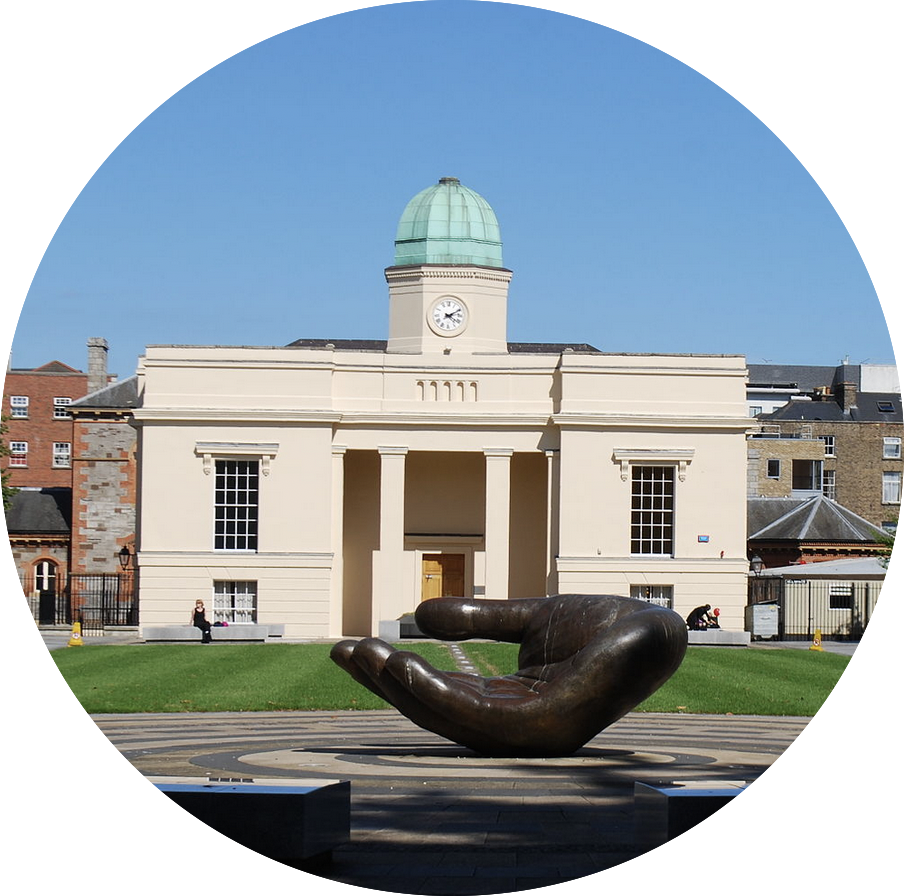
The Infant Model School with adapted clock tower

Owen's eye for symmetry in the redesign of Dublin's public architecture is nowhere better demonstrated than in his transformation of the townhouse and grounds of Marcus Beresford, 1st Earl of Tyrone's former estate. Owen largely preserved the original 1770 mansion townhouse designed by Richard Cassels, and designed a facsimile of the Georgian building adjacent to the original. The symmetry of this mirrored design was completed with the addition, in 1838, of a third building, the Infant Model School, placed to the rear of the block, between the two Marlborough Street townhouses. Viewed together, these buildings form a sublime triangle.

Owen's design intervention on the original mansion townhouse has been criticised. Of these criticisms, the National Inventory of Architectural Heritage notes, "Owens' [sic] additions to the west façade, though criticized by purists, are elegantly executed and sympathetic to the original composition. Designed as a freestanding building, Tyrone House now anchors the 19th-century set-piece comprising later additions to the site, among them Jacob Owens' [sic] replica of Tyrone House to the north of the original, also addressing Marlborough Street.' The school building, also known as the Clocktower Building, was described by architectural historian Christine Casey as a '"[d]elightful low-lying and stuccoed parapeted block" that can be seen from Marlborough Street. The NIAH's appraisal of the Infant Model School notes that it is "contextualised by its neighbouring related buildings and provid[es] an aesthetically pleasing backdrop."

=== Talbot House, Dublin ===
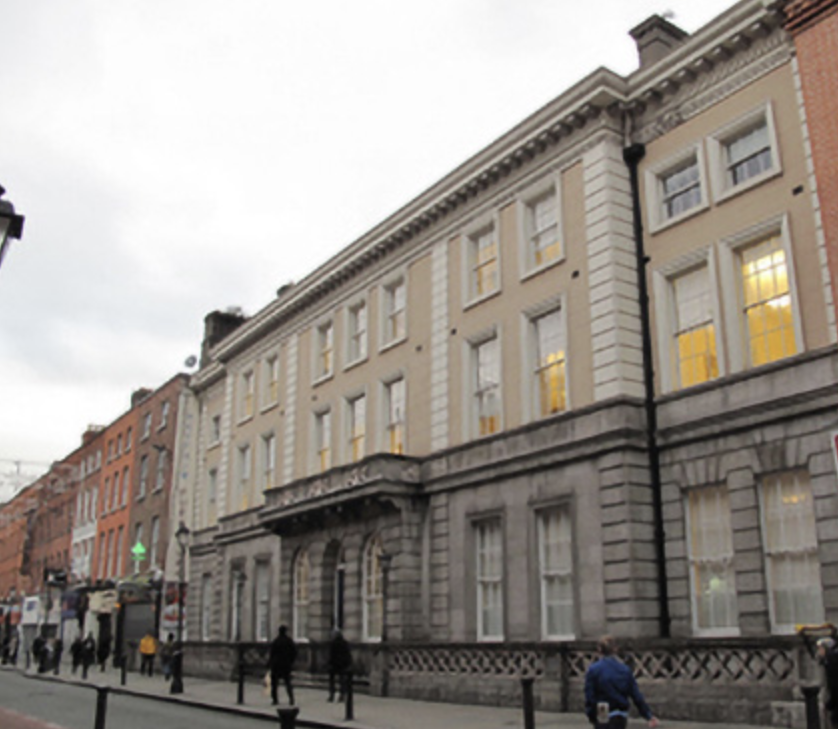
Talbot House, Dublin designed by Jacob Owen in 1842

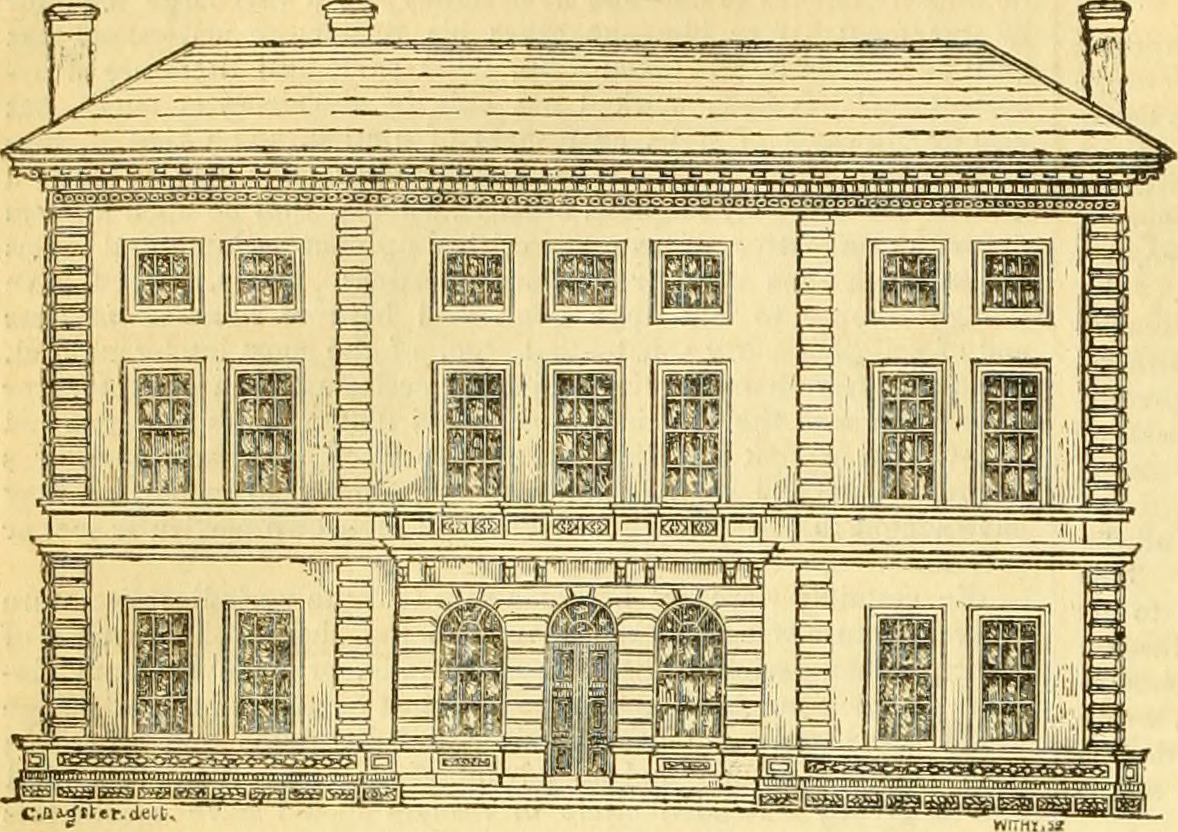
Illustration of Owen's design prior to the 1859 alteration

Described by architectural historian Jeremy Williams as 'a restrained Italianate palazzo,' Owen's design for Talbot House was credited with introducing the "Italian style" to Ireland on its completion. In fact, Italianate influences can be seen in earlier works by Dublin architects John B. Keane and Patrick Byrne, yet Owen's adaptation of the Palazzo style was novel. The original building was designed by Owen for the Department of Education in 1842 as one of the first female teacher training schools in Ireland.

While early appraisals compared it to Palazzo Farnese in Rome, they also noted the site, with its proximity to surrounding buildings and narrow street frontage on Talbot Street, constrained the building. The later side wings, added by Owen's son, James, in 1859, contributed to its hemmed in condition. The appraisal of Talbot House for the National Inventory of Architectural Heritage notes that the "façade is distinguished by a subtle symmetry created by the arrangement of bays, a projecting front flanked by side bays, as well as by stucco detailing including deep cornice and window surrounds." Internally, Williams notes Owen's hand in the "severe Grecian entrance hall with fluted Doric columns".

== Bibliography ==
- ——————, 'Jacob Owen, 1778 - 1870,' Dictionary of Irish Architects 1720–1940,
- ——————,'Jacob Owen, 1778 -1870,' L'Encyclopédie de L'Architecture et de la Construction, P. Planat (ed.), Vol.6 (Paris: Aulanier, 1894)
- Casey, Christine. Dublin: The City Within the Grand and Royal Canals and the Circular Road (New Haven: Yale University Press, 2005)
- McCabe, Desmond. Major Figures in the History of the OPW: Celebrating 175 Years (Dublin: Government Publications, The Office of Public Works, 2006)
- McDermott, M J. 'Notable Irish architectural families: 7. The Owens,' in The Architectural Forum (Dublin), 1982, 96-98
- O'Dwyer, Frederick. 'The Architecture of the Board of Public Works 1831-1923', in Public Works: the architecture of the Office of Public Works 1831-1987 (AAI, 1987), 11-20
- O'Dwyer, Frederick. 'Building empires: architecture, politics and the Board of Works 1760-1860', Irish Architectural and Decorative Studies 5 (2002). 147-1164
- O'Dwyer, Frederick. 'Jacob Owen, 1778 - 1870,' Oxford Dictionary of National Biography
- Owen, James Higgins. 'Jacob Owen, 1778 - 1870,' The Dictionary of Architecture, ed. by W. Papworth (London: Architectural Publication Society, 1853-1892)
- Pike, Sue. Thomas Ellis Owen: Shaper of Portsmouth, 'Father of Southsea' (Tricorn Books, 2011)
- Porter, Bertha. 'Jacob Owen, 1778 - 1870,' Dictionary of National Biography (1885-1900)
