= Tyrone House, Dublin =

Palladian Georgian house in Dublin, Ireland

Tyrone House
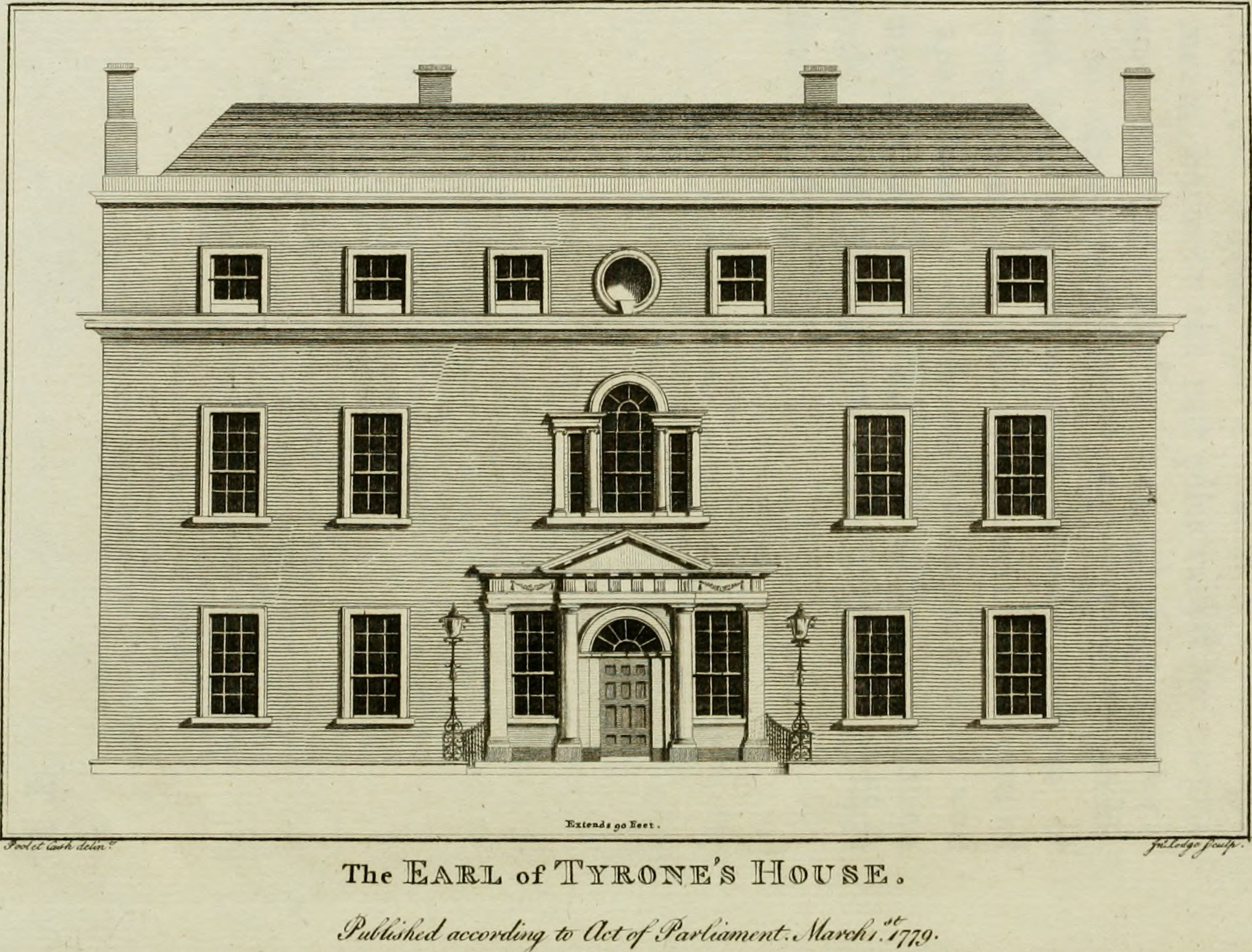
- An illustration of the house in the 1770s before the removal of the central venetian window and the addition of a portico.

- Location within Central Dublin
- Alternative names: Waterford House

General information
- Type: House
- Architectural style: Palladian
- Location: The Department of Education, Marlborough Street, Dublin, Ireland
- Coordinates: 53°21′02″N 6°15′28″W
- Current tenants: Department of Education
- Completed: 1740
- Renovated: 1836
- Cost: £25,000
- Owner: Office of Public Works

Technical details
- Material: Granite
- Floor count: 3 over basement

Design and construction
- Architect: Richard Cassels
- Developer: Marcus Beresford, 1st Earl of Tyrone

Renovating team
- Architect: Jacob Owen (1835)

Tyrone House is a Georgian Palladian style mansion townhouse built for Marcus Beresford, 1st Earl of Tyrone in 1740. It was constructed on lands bordering Marlborough Street in what was to become a fashionable part of North Dublin city off Sackville Street. It was one of the first substantial aristocratic houses built on the North side of Dublin city.

The house was situated overlooking Marlborough Bowling Green, which was then a fashionable enclave where the wealthy elite could socialize until it fell out of favour following the death of Lord Delvin in a duel in 1761.

== History ==
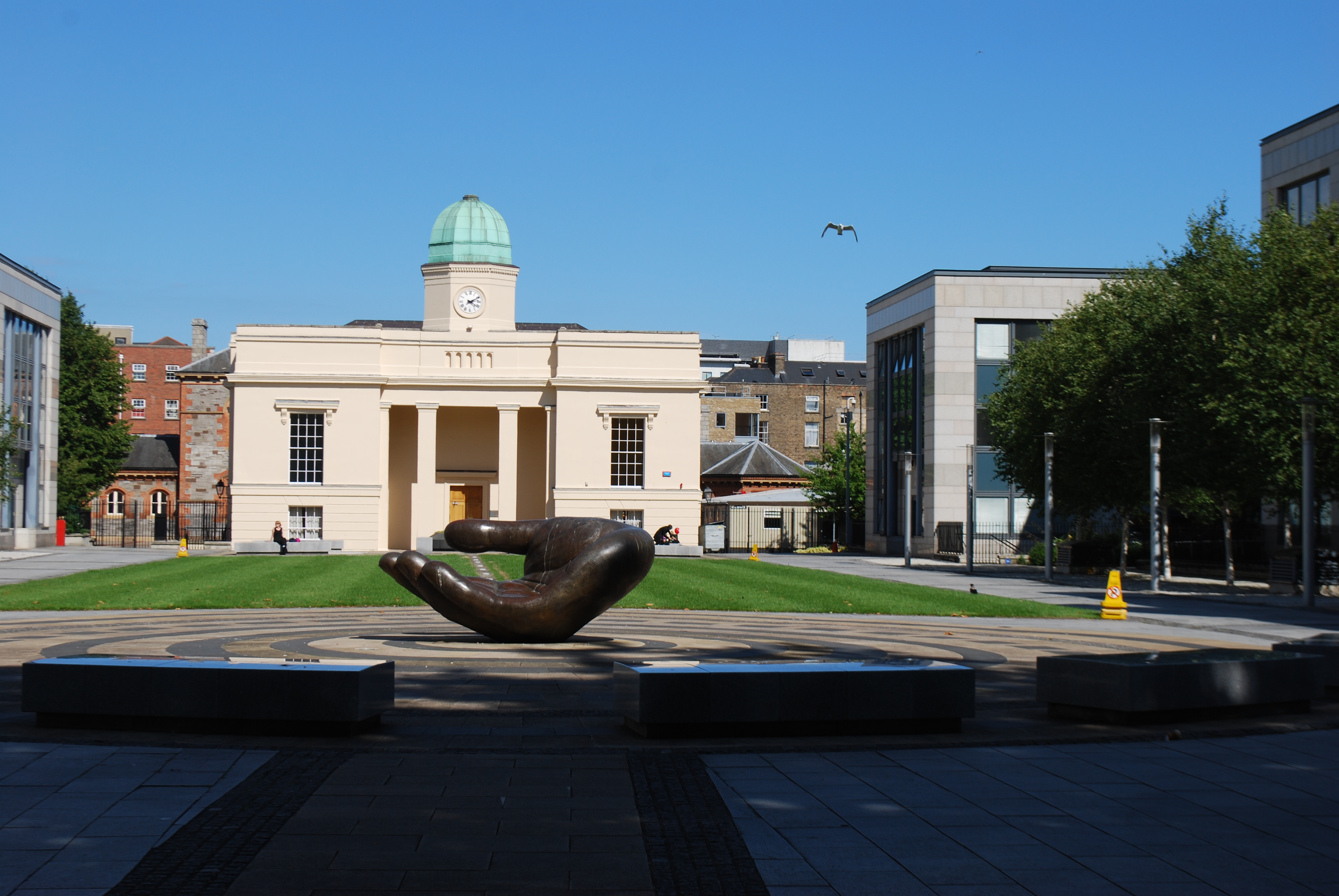
The Model School (1838)

The area around the house had traditionally been part of the lands of St. Mary's Abbey and had later partially included lands which were granted to Jonathon Amory in 1675, later referred to as the Amory Grant.

The area surrounding the house later became fashionable in Georgian Dublin due to the existence of the Marlborough Bowling Green and Pleasure Gardens. As early as 1728 the bowling green at the strand is mentioned in the Dublin Weekly Journal. Later in 1753, a musical evening and fireworks display is recorded as having occurred to raise funds for the construction of a wooden bridge across the Liffey to benefit the wealthy patrons south of the river.

The 1st earl died at the house in 1763 and the house was left to his son, George Beresford, styled the Marquess of Waterford in 1789. As a result, the house was often called Waterford House on maps during that period. He also gave his name to nearby Waterford Street.

Nearby Beresford Place was later named in honour of the first earl's grandson, John Claudius Beresford upon its construction in the 1790s.

Stables were constructed on Marlborough Street near the house and a riding school referred to as Beresford's Riding School was established and used to train the yeomanry around the time of the Irish Rebellion of 1798.

=== 1834 sale and change of use ===
In 1834 the house and five adjoining acres were sold for £7,000 to the National Education Commissioners. The house later became part of the Department of Education's campus which also encompasses the original model school as well as a facsimile of the altered version of Tyrone House, both of which were designed by Jacob Owen a few years after the purchase.

In the second half of the 19th century, a statue of Sir Alexander Macdonnell, 1st Baronet by Thomas Farrell was erected in the grounds of the house.

As of 2022, the house has been partially restored to its former glory and is an administrative building which forms part of the Department of Education's main campus. An illustrated image of the house often features as part of the logo on the headed notepaper and official correspondence issued by the department.

=== Tyrone Ghost Story ===
A well-known ghost story relates to the house concerning the appearance of Lord Tyrone as a ghost to prove the existence of life after death. In 1948, an unknown author and artist Ed Moritz adapted the ghost story into a 2-page comic for the first issue of the American Comics Group horror anthology Adventures into the Unknown.

== Design and construction ==
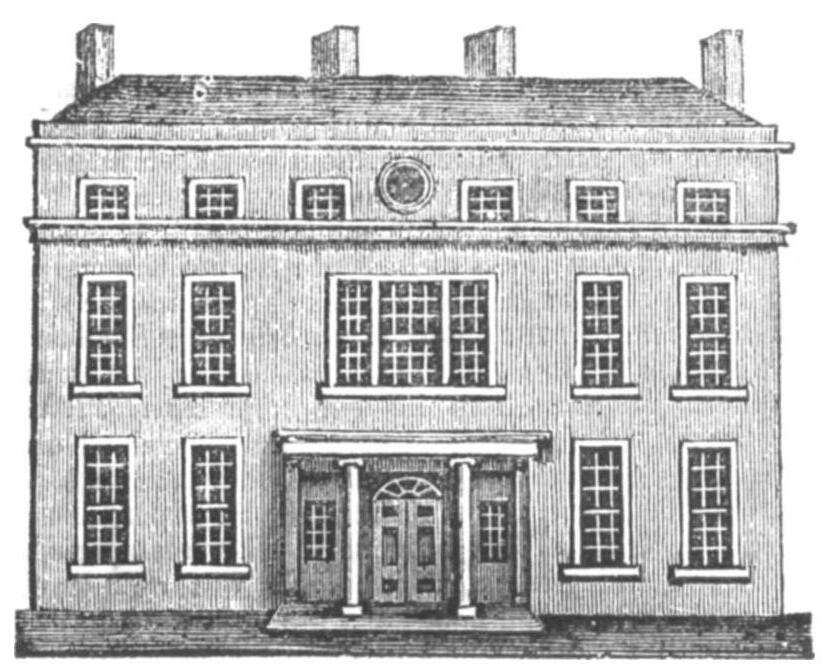
Tyrone House as seen in an illustration in the Dublin Penny Journal in February 1836 after alterations were made by Jacob Owen.

The house was built in 1740 to a design by Richard Cassels and was said to be his first stone-fronted free-standing house in Dublin. Later, the house was altered by Jacob Owen in 1835 adding a prostyle tetrastyle granite portico and removing the central front venetian window on the first floor while leaving much of the house unchanged. The house is mainly faced in granite ashlar with calp ashlar walls at the basement level while the house still features some of its original Portland stone sills.

The elaborate interior stucco work is generally attributed to the Lafranchini brothers and contrasts with the severe limestone exterior.

The house was surrounded by a high wall but these were replaced with the present iron railings when the house was developed by the Department of Education in 1836.
