= Joseph Butterworth Owen =

British clergyman (1809–1872)

The Reverend Joseph Butterworth Owen MA
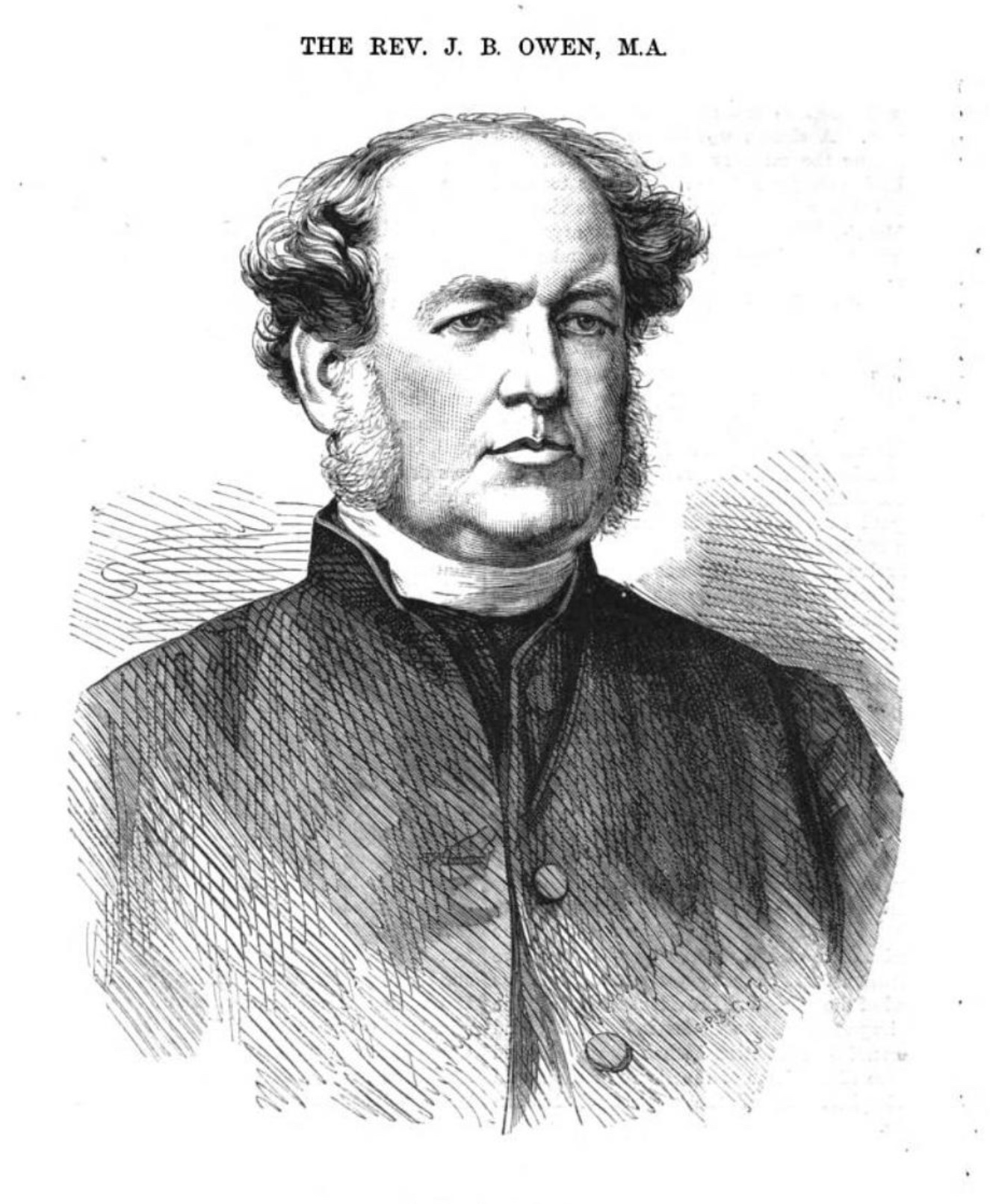
- Church: St John's Chapel, Bedford Row (1854 to 1857)
- Metropolis: London
- Predecessor: Thomas Dealtry
- Other posts: St Mary's, Bilston (1838 to 1854); St Jude's, Chelsea (1859 to 1872)

Orders
- Ordination: Church of England by Henry Dudley Ryder
- Rank: Parish clergy

Personal details
- Born: 22 July 1809 Portsmouth, Hampshire, England
- Died: May 18, 1872 (aged 62) 40 Cadogan Place Belgravia, London
- Buried: Brompton Cemetery
- Denomination: Anglican
- Parents: Jacob Owen, Mary Underhill
- Spouse: Louisa Higgins
- Occupation: Chairman of the Board of the Royal Free Hospital; Chancellor of The Royal Polytechnic Institution; Theologian; Social Reformer
- Education: St Paul's Grammar School
- Alma mater: St John's College, Cambridge
- Motto: Firmitas in Caelo

The Reverend Joseph Butterworth Owen (22 July 1809 - 24 May 1872) was an English clergyman, social reformer and author of the nineteenth century. Known primarily for his published work, he is also notable for being the last minister of the famed Evangelical Chapel St John's Chapel, Bedford Row as well as chancellor of The Royal Polytechnic Institution. Owen's published sermons and biography provided the target for Samuel Butler's satirical novel The Fair Haven.

== Biography ==
=== Early life ===
Joseph Butterworth Owen was born at Portsmouth on 22 July 1809, the son on Mary Owen (née Underhill) and Jacob Owen. Born into a prosperous upper-middle-class family, Owen's father ran a private architectural practice and later became the Principal Architect and Engineer of the Office of Public Works, Ireland. Owen expressed a desire to enter the Church from an early age. He was educated first at St Paul’s Grammar School, Portsmouth before entering St John’s College, Cambridge. Through his mother’s family, Owen was cousin to Francis Underhill, bishop of Bath and Wells, and the spiritualist and author Evelyn Underhill. These branches of the Underhill family were related through a common religious ancestor in the eighteenth century, John Underhill, a stout Nonconformist divine. Although Owen’s father Jacob was Methodist, it appears that Owen was christened in the Church of England, allowing him to enter Cambridge University, at that time reserved for members of the established church.

=== Cambridge and early career ===
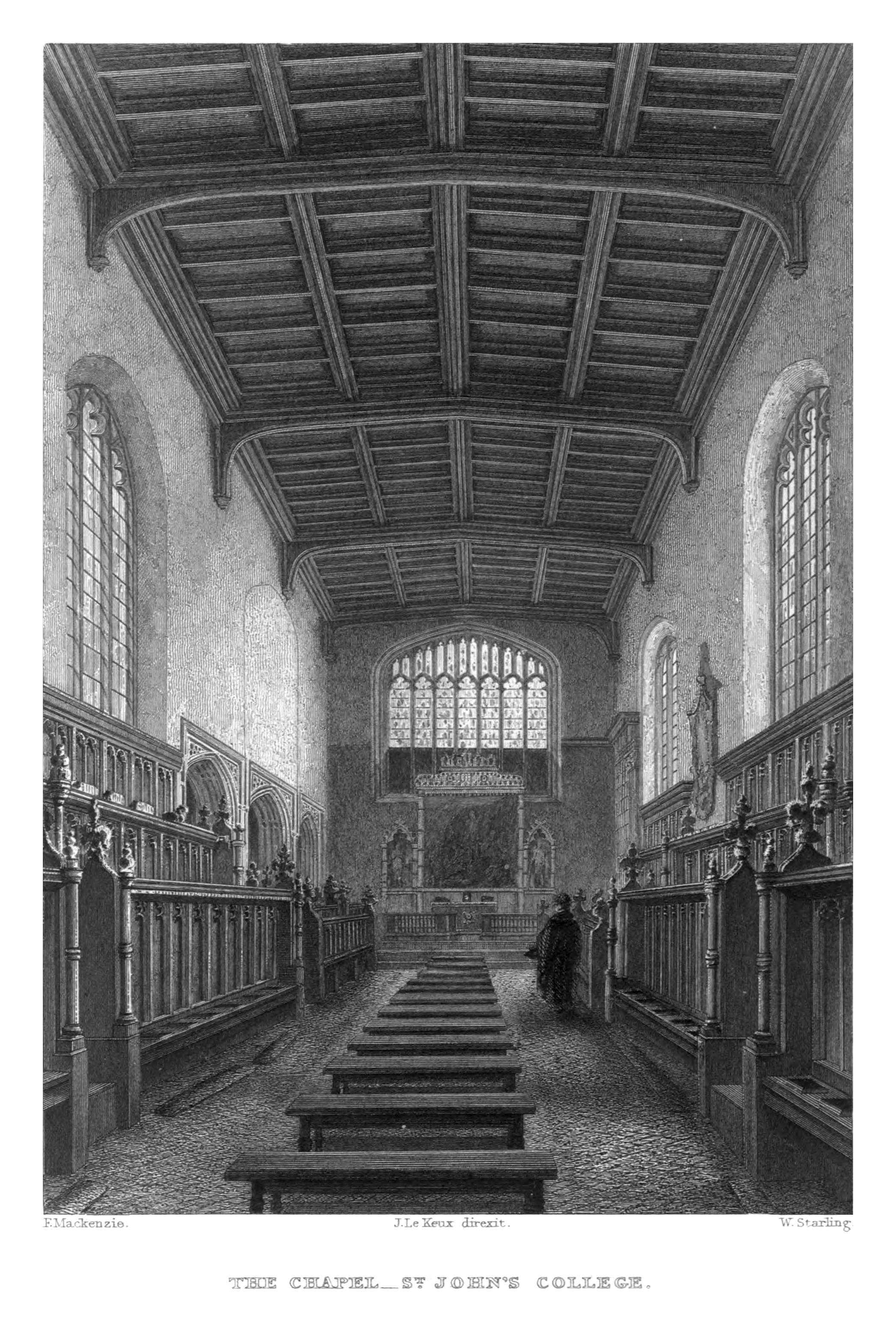
St John's College Chapel, Cambridge shortly after Owen's matriculation

While in London, Owen's brother, Jeremiah prepared him to study mathematics at Cambridge. Owen’s biographer, his son Edward Annesley Owen, noted that religion became increasingly important for Owen while at St John’s College. His study of Mathematics suffered and Owen recalled disappointing the high expectations of his family for failing to make the Tripos list. At Cambridge he met John Allen, later Archdeacon of Salop, who later became his brother-in-law. Owen graduated with a Bachelor of Arts in 1829 and a Master of Arts in 1833.

In 1835, he was ordained as minister of Warsall Wood by Henry Dudley Ryder, then Bishop of Lichfield and Coventry. Owen left this post to take up another role at Farthingstone where he preached until 1838. That year he took up the perpetual curacy of St Mary’s, Bilston. The following year he married Louisa Higgins, also the child of an architect.

=== St Mary’s, Bilston ===
Owen occupied the perpetual curacy of St Mary’s from 1838 to 1854. During his years at Bilston, a working class a coal mining community, he developed a central community presence for the church. Many of his published sermons from this time are directed at working class concerns. He campaigned for the Public Health Act 1848, as well as better sanitation and housing for the working poor. At Bliston, Owen also took up the cause of adult education which would be a lasting personal crusade for the remainder of his life. While living in Staffordshire, Owen also preached at St George's Church, Wolverhampton. This latter role led to Owen taking up the Chairmanship of the Wolverhampton Poor Law Union for most of his tenure at Bilston.

Owen was conservative in his politics. In response to strong support for the Chartist movement in the Black Country, he founded and edited the Midland Monitor from 1942 to 1844 to 'stem the torrent of infidel and revolutionary literature raging among the working classes.' Despite claiming to 'decry the bigotry of the party, as if one was all right and the other all wrong', he became a vocal champion for prominent Conservatives from the late 1840s. He supported the nomination of Lord Lewisham in the 1849 elections, and later the mayoral candidacy of George Benjamin Thorneycroft in 1854. (Note: Owen later penned Thorneycroft's biography, “Diligent in Business, Fervent in Spirit:” A Memoir of the Late G.B. Thorneycroft (London: Hamilton, Adams and Co., 1856)) His connection to the reformist wing of the Conservatives continued after he left Staffordshire through his close association with the Earl of Shaftesbury and his various social and political causes.

=== St John’s Chapel, Bedford Row ===
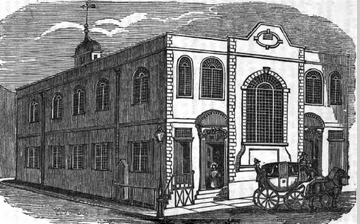
St John's Chapel, Bedford Row in the years before its demolition

Owen left Bilston in 1854 to take up the incumbency of St John's Chapel, Bedford Row. He had a relatively short and dramatic tenure in his role as the last Minister of the church (1854 - 1857). Throughout the nineteenth century, St John's Chapel had been a magnet for Evangelicals of the Established Church, becoming the centre of the abolitionist movement and closely associated with the Clapham Sect. By Owen’s time, however, the great age of Evangelical reformism had passed, and the congregation was much diminished. Owen’s term as Minister of the chapel was cut short in November 1856 when he noticed significant damage to the structure of the building. It was reported that ’when the Minister ascended the pulpit, he perceived, from signs not to be mistaken, that the whole of the immense and massive roof had shifted and sunk, and might at any instant crush him and the whole congregation. A very short sermon naturally, and most wisely, followed this discovery; and that was the last sermon preached, or ever to be preached [in the chapel].’ During his time at St John’s Chapel, Owen also took up the chaplaincy of the Royal Free Hospital, at Gray’s Inn Road, later becoming the chairman of the hospital's Board of Governors.

=== The Royal Polytechnic Institution ===
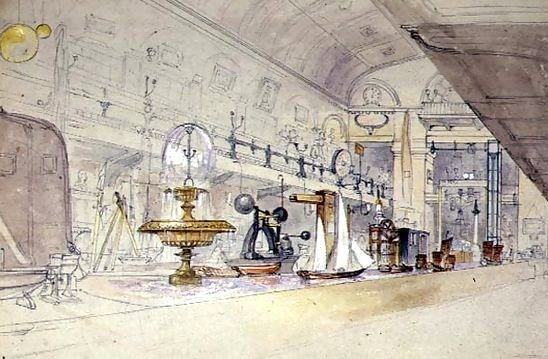
Interior of The Royal Polytechnic Institution

Around the time of St John’s demolition, Owen became Chairman of The Royal Polytechnic institution (now the University of Westminster). During this period, the Bishop of London appealed to the clergy to improve the moral, intellectual and spiritual condition of young men in London through their education. In this work, he continued his interest in the education of the working classes that he had begun in Bilston. He remained chairman of the Institution for fifteen years, a period when it went through expansion and a period of decline. Owen's chairmanship of the Polytechnic drew together his twin commitments to self-improvement for the working-class and Christian-influenced education. Following his death in 1872, these strands of the Polytechnic were brought to the fore in its renaming as the Polytechnic Young Men's Christian Institute.

=== St Jude’s, Chelsea ===
Following the destruction of St John’s Chapel, Owen took up a period of ‘guerrilla ministry’ before taking up the rectorship of St Jude’s, Chelsea in 1859. While now preaching in the more salubrious neighbourhood of Chelsea, Owen maintained his interest in social reformism. He took leading roles in the Society for Improving the Condition of the Labouring Classes, the Young Men's Christian Association, and the Royal Society for the Prevention of Cruelty to Animals. In the 1860s, Owen sat on the council for the Victoria Institute, a religious anti-Darwinist organisation founded by Owen's friend and associate, the Earl of Shaftebury following the publication of The Origin of Species.

=== Death ===
Owen died on 18 May 1872 at home at Cadogan Place and was buried at Brompton Cemetery on 24 May 1872. He spent his last week chairing The Royal Polytechnic institution. His death was commemorated by the Earl of Shaftesbury, and noted in the Quiver which asserted that 'Mr Owen was known to be a prince amongst lecturers as well as a distinguished preacher.' During his lifetime, the Quiver noted that Owen was well known in most parts of the United Kingdom for his 'Herculean' ministerial and practical Christian labours. It also noted he had 'attained a very wide renown' for his lecturing. 'His style is terse, rigorous, and epigrammatic. He teaches simple earnest evangelical truth in a more attractive style than—we regret to say it—is often to be met with. He is master of pathetic description: though, like a wise orator, he seldom indulges in that in which he is so peculiarly at home.'

== Family ==
Owen's descendants, through his daughter Louisa Sparks Owen, include his grandson, the illustrator John Hassall, his grandchildren, the wood engraver Joan Hassall and the poet, biographer, and lyricist Christopher Hassall, and his great-granddaughter, the actress Imogen Hassall. Another daughter, Josephine Frances Royse was a secretary of the National Union of Women's Suffrage Societies, fighting against anti-Suffragists in the strongholds of Walmer and Deal.

== Published work ==
Owen was a prolific published author. He was a regular contributor to The Leisure Hour, The Quiver and other religious journals. Many of his sermons are collected into ‘Lectures and Sermons etc by the late Rev. Joseph Butterworth Owen’ published after his death. A number of works were also published during his lifetime, including:

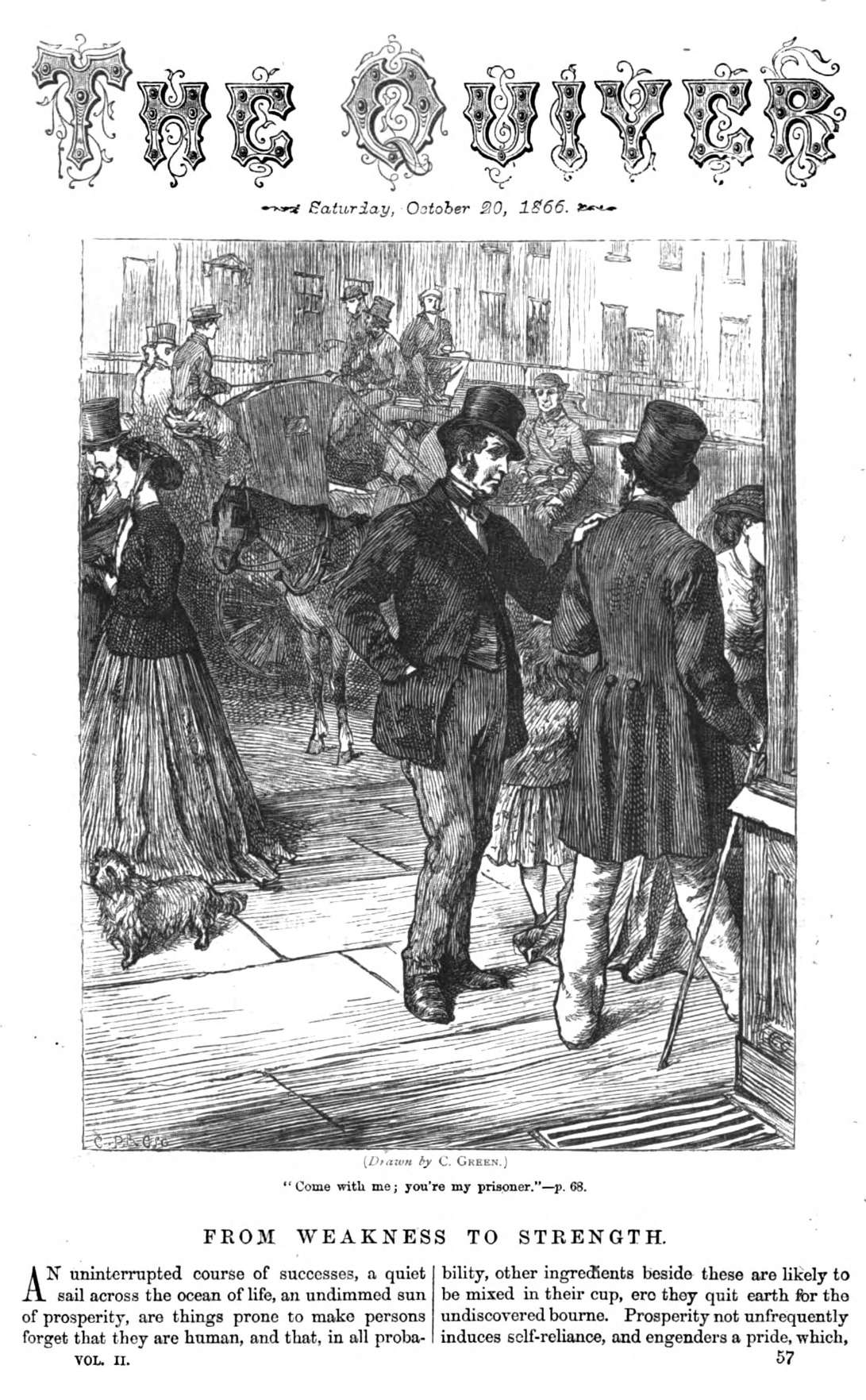
An issue of The Quiver from the 1860s when Owen was a regular contributor

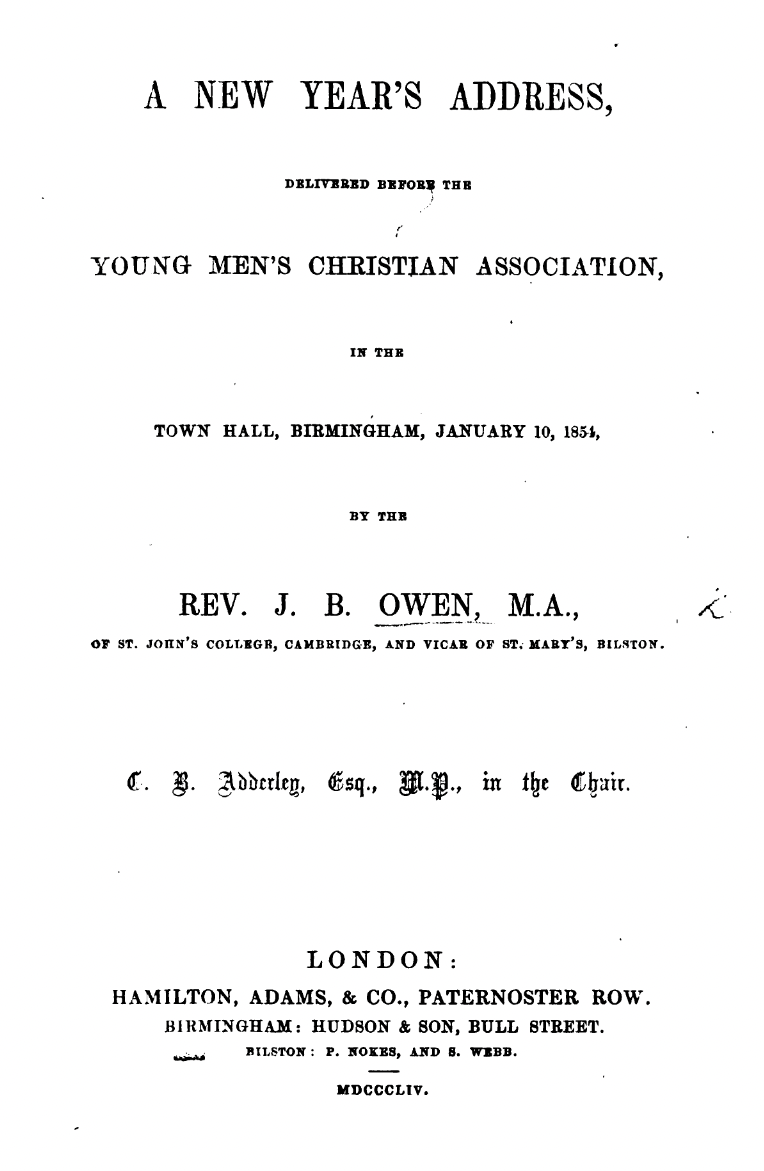
An example of Owen's published works

- The Practical Uses of the Doctrine of a Trinity (1837);
- Six Lectures on the Rite of Confirmation (1840);
- Infallibility as professed and practised by the Church of Rome: Antiscriptural and Uncatholic (1840);
- “Home”: its associations, influences, and prospects (1842);
- Christ the Type of Christians (1852);
- The Pottery Schoolmaster: A Biographical Sketch of Silas Even (1852);
- A New Year's Address (1854);
- Young England: its ins and outs (1854);
- ”Diligent in Business, Fervent in Spirit:" a Memoir of the Late G.B. Thorneycroft (1856)
- The Mischief and Miseries of Temper (1857);
- Business Without Christianity (1858);
- Piety: the charm of a poor man's home (1858);
- Old friends, and what became of them (1862);
- The First Dissenter (1862);
- Stereoscopic Views of Misunderstood Men (1863);
- Cliques, social, professional and religious (1864);
- The Homes of Scripture (1865);
- Men's Infirmities, Natural and Acquired (1865);
- The Scripture Arguments in Favour of Recognition (1866);
- Pre-Calvary Martyrs and Other Papers (1872) (Note: A complete list of Owen's published works, excluding work published in popular and religious journals, can be found in Rupert Simms, Bibliotheca Staffordiensis (Lichfield: A.C. Lomax, 1894), 339-340)

== Satirized by Samuel Butler ==
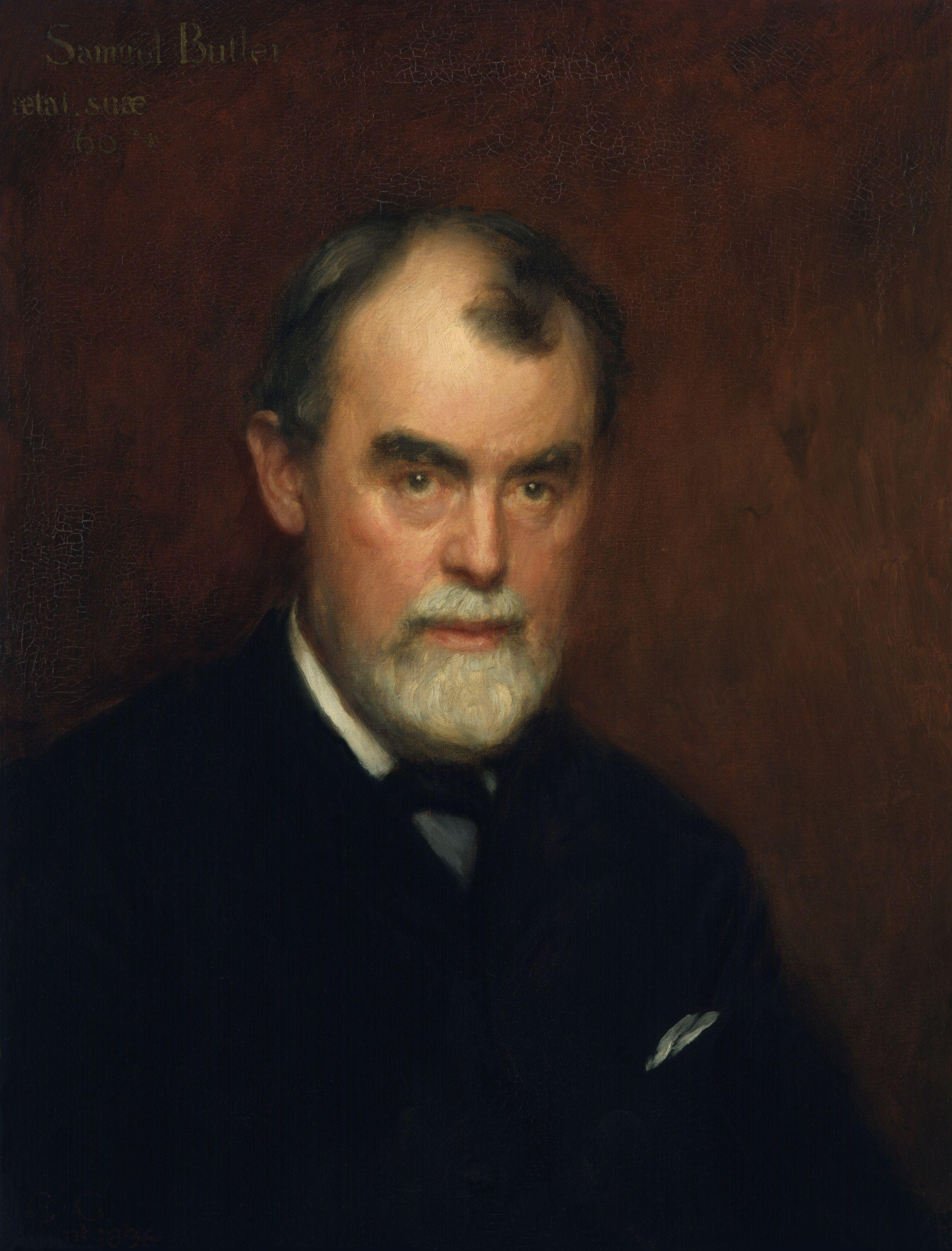
Samuel Butler by Charles Gogin

Owen’s lecturers and biography ‘Lectures and Sermons etc by the late Rev. Joseph Butterworth Owen, Together with a Brief Memoir of His Life, by his son Edward Annesley Owen’ provided the inspiration for Samuel Butler’s satire The Fair Haven subtitled ‘a work in defence of the miraculous element in Our Lord's ministry upon earth, both as against rationalist impugners and certain orthodox defenders, by the late John Pickard Owen, with a memoir of the author by William Bickersteth Owen.’ The publisher's note in Butler’s essays on humour contended that ‘In none of his writings did Butler wield the master-spell of irony with more trenchant effect, and in none is his skill as a controversialist more triumphantly exhibited. The memoir of the fictitious author of the book, John Pickard Owen, by his equally fictitious brother, William Bickersteth Owen, is one of the most delightful products of Butler's imagination.’

The exact target of the satire, beyond Owen himself, is unclear. Literary scholars including Northrup Frye and James G. Paradis have argued that its presentation originally as a work by John Pickard Owen and William Bickersteth Owen made it a ‘literary hoax,’ presented, in the manner of Owen’s biography and works, as a sincere account. Once it was known he was the true author of the work, Butler refuted that he had meant it to be a work of satire. Having published first edition under a pseudonym, he explained ‘The fact is that I was in a very awkward situation. My previous work Erewhon, had failed to give satisfaction to certain ultra-orthodox Christians [and] I was given to understand that I should find it far from easy to dispossess them of the notion that something in the way of satire had been intended […] I had reason to believe that if I defended Christianity in my own name […] I might be suspected of satire again with no greater reason’ Few scholars have taken Butler’s claims that the work was a defence of Christianity at face value. Joseph Barthélemy Fort argued that it was ‘not without some Machiavellian ulterior motive [that Butler] borrowed the name of the pious pastor of St. Jude's.’ Owen was, Fort argues, ‘at least by his published works the very type of churchman that Butler hated the most.’ (Note: In the original French ’non sans quelque arrière-pensée machiavélique, emprunter le nom du pieux pasteur de St Jude. Celui-ci était, du moins par ses guvres publiées le type meme d'ecelésiaslique que Butler détestait le plus.’)
