= Frederick Clarendon =

Irish architect (1820–1904)

Frederick Villiers Clarendon
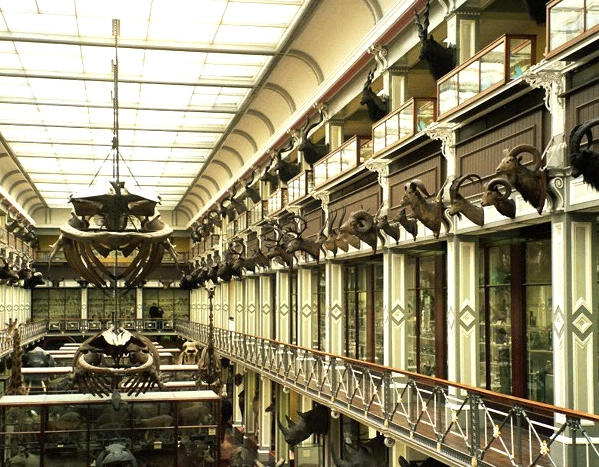
- Interior of the Natural History Museum
- Born: C. 1820; Dublin, Ireland
- Died: 1904; Dublin
- Education: Trinity College, Dublin
- Occupation: Architect
- Practice: Board of Public Works
- Buildings: National History Museum, Dublin

Frederick Villiers Clarendon (c.1820 – 17 October 1904) was an Irish architect noted for his design work on a number of large public buildings in Dublin, including the Natural History Museum and Arbour Hill Prison.

== Life ==
Frederick Clarendon was born in Dublin around 1820 and received a Bachelor of Arts at Dublin University in 1839. Directly after graduation he was employed by the Office of Public Works, where he would remain until his retirement in 1887. Clarendon died in Mountjoy Square, Dublin in 1904.

== Works ==
Clarendon's earliest major works focussed on Dublin's prison system. Arbour Hill Prison was redesigned in 1845 by Sir. Joshua Jebb with Clarendon acting as executive architect, and Clarendon was also co-designer of the "Criminal Lunatic Asylum" in Dundrum two years later. Clarendon oversaw the renovation and extension of the Royal Irish Academy's premises on Dawson Street between 1852 and 1854, as their existing Grafton Street location had become overcrowded. Clarendon's most remembered work is Ireland's Natural History Museum on Merrion Street adjacent to Leinster House, known as the "Dead Zoo". The Royal Dublin Society had been obliged to use a public architect to obtain treasury funding, and the building was taken over by the State in 1877. Today the Museum forms part of the National Museum of Ireland. Clarendon provided his services free of charge to design the Mariners Hall, Howth in 1867. This then served as a Presbyterian Meeting House for over thirty years, services being conducted through the medium of Scottish Gaelic, the language of the immigrant seasonal fishermen of the village.

== Arms ==
Coat of arms of Frederick Clarendon
Notes Confirmed by Sir Arthur Vicars, Ulster King of Arms, 26 May 1904. Crest On a wreath of the colours an ostrich feather barry Argent and Sable. Escutcheon Or on a bend cotised all indented Sable three pairs of ostrich feathers in saltire Argent. Motto Amando Servio

== See also ==
- Architecture of Ireland
