= Arbour Hill Prison =

Medium-security prison in Ireland

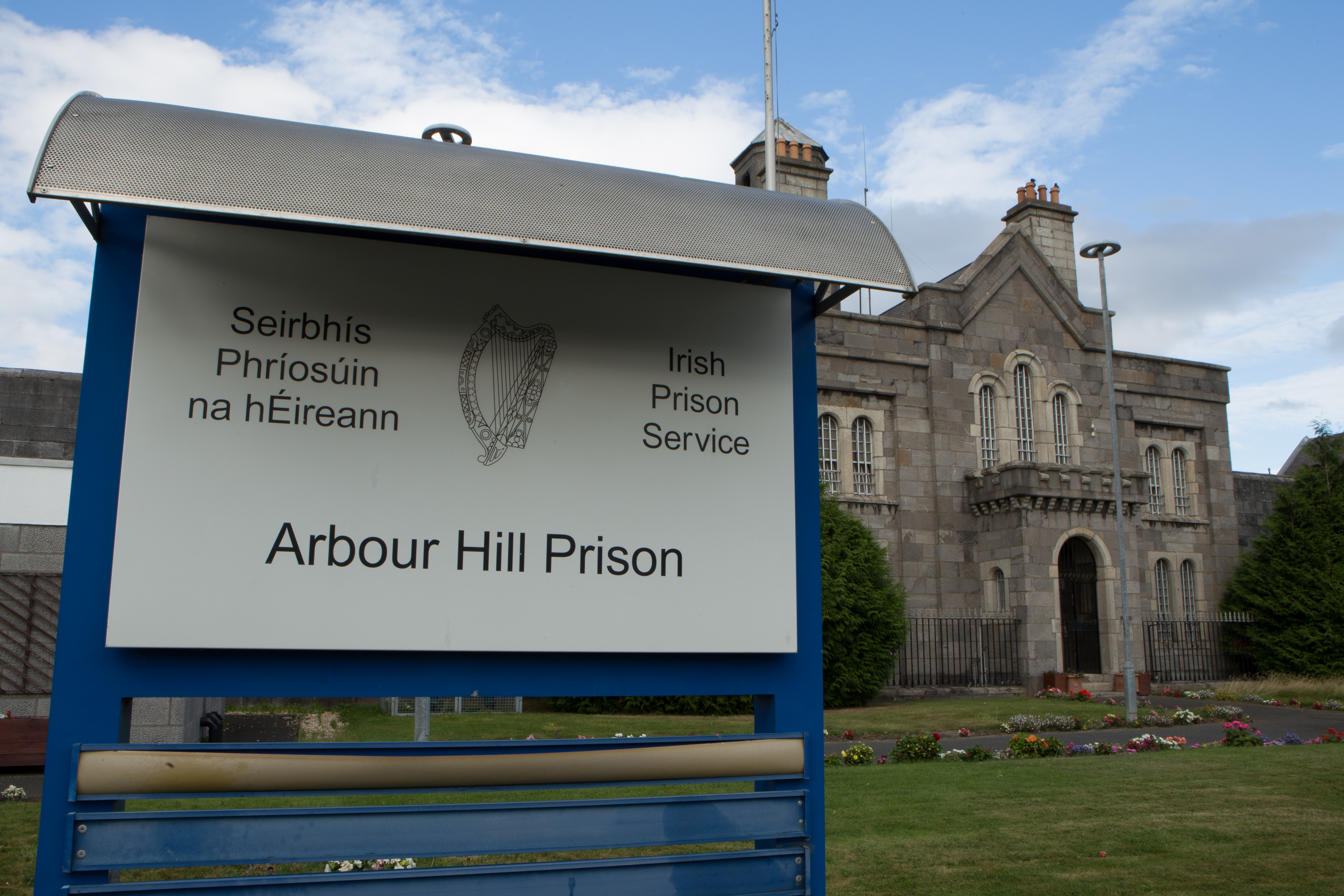

- Location in Central Dublin
- Location: Dublin; 53°20′58.3″N 6°17′15.8″W
- Status: Operational
- Security class: Medium security
- Capacity: 148
- Opened: 1848 (civilian 1975)
- Managed by: Irish Prison Service
- Governor: Ms. Claire Hurley

Arbour Hill Prison (Irish: Príosún Chnoc an Arbhair) is a prison located in the Arbour Hill area near Heuston Station in the centre of Dublin, Ireland. The prison is the national centre for male sex offenders.

Adjacent to the prison are the Church of the Sacred Heart, the official church of the Irish Defence Forces, and its cemetery, containing a memorial and burial place of 14 executed leaders of the 1916 Easter Rising.

== Architecture ==
The prison was designed by Sir Joshua Jebb and Frederick Clarendon and opened on its present site in 1848, to house military prisoners. The church has an unusual entrance porch with stairs leading to twin galleries for visitors in the nave and transept. Another unusual feature is the Celtic round tower which erupts from a rectangular base. It opened as a civilian prison in 1975.

The adjoining Church of the Sacred Heart, which is the prison chapel for Arbour Hill prison, is maintained by the Department of Defence. At the rear of the church lies the old cemetery, where lie the remains of British military personnel who died in the Dublin area in the 19th and early 20th centuries.

An interesting feature is the tunnel which runs from St Bricin's Military Hospital, via the Prison to the former Collins Barracks.

A doorway beside the 1916 memorial gives access to the Irish United Nations Veterans' Association house and memorial garden.

== Inmates ==
Notable former inmates include Ray Burke TD and former Irish Times journalist Tom Humphries.

In 1936 Moss Twomey, the Chief of Staff of the Irish Republican Army was held in isolation in Arbour Hill before being transferred to Curragh Camp. On 19 April 1940, Irish Republican Jack McNeela died in Arbor Hill Prison after 55 days on hunger strike. McNella had been arrested and jailed for operating a pro-republican pirate radio station.

Another pirate radio operator, Eamonn Cooke, served time in Arbor Hill for sexual offences until shortly before his death in 2016.

== 1916 leaders ==
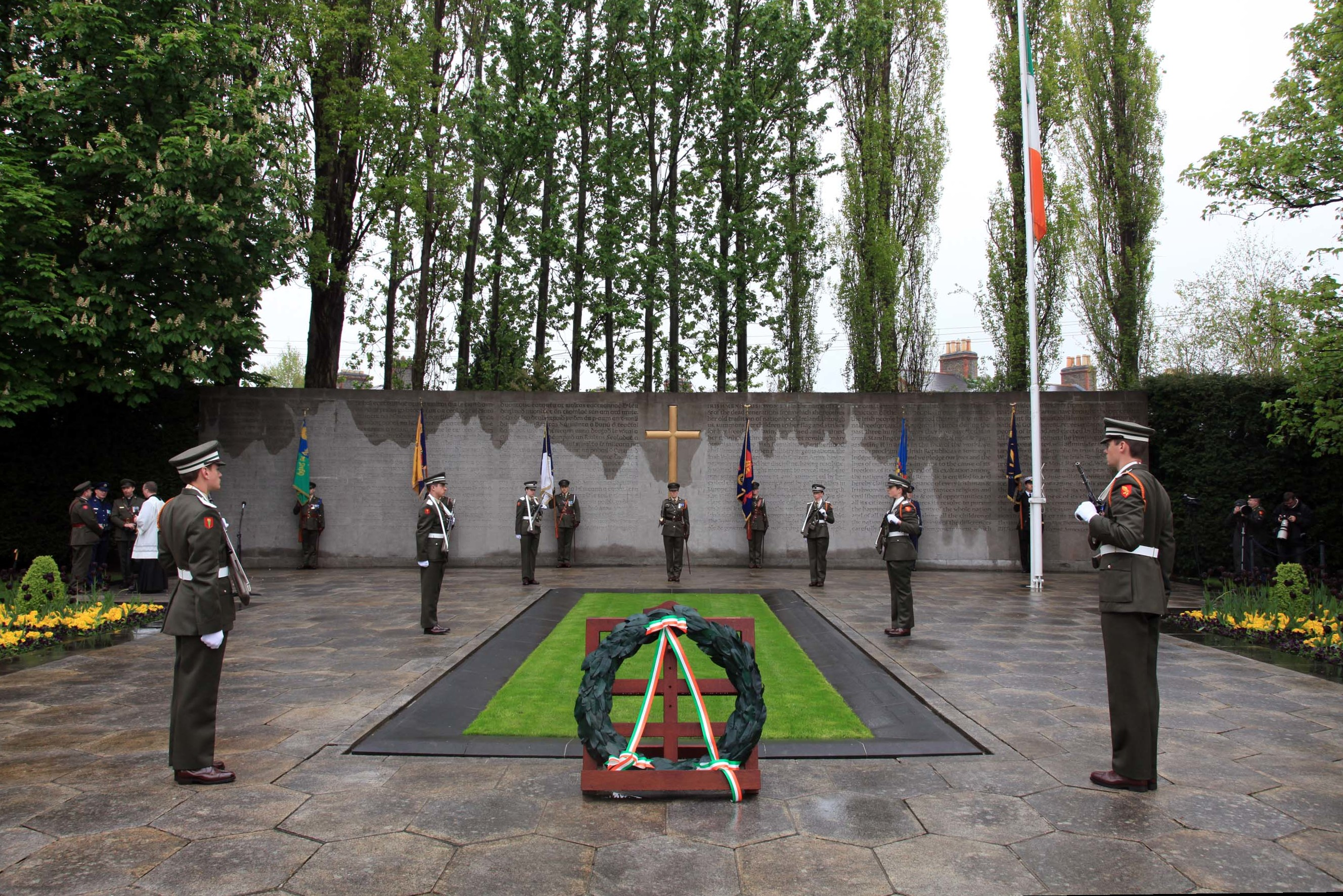
1916 Commemoration Wreath Laying Ceremony (2010)

The military cemetery behind this prison is the burial place of 14 of the executed leaders of the 1916 Easter Rising. The leaders were executed in Kilmainham Gaol and their bodies were transported to Arbour Hill for burial. The 14 buried in Arbour Hill are:

- Patrick Pearse
- Tom Clarke
- Thomas MacDonagh
- Joseph Plunkett
- Éamonn Ceannt
- Seán Mac Diarmada
- James Connolly
- Ned Daly
- Willie Pearse
- Michael O'Hanrahan
- John MacBride
- Michael Mallin
- Con Colbert
- Seán Heuston

The graves are located under a low mound on a terrace of Wicklow granite in what was once the old prison yard. The grave site is surrounded by a limestone wall on which the names are inscribed in Irish and English. On the prison wall opposite the grave site is a plaque with the names of other people who were killed in 1916.

== Location ==
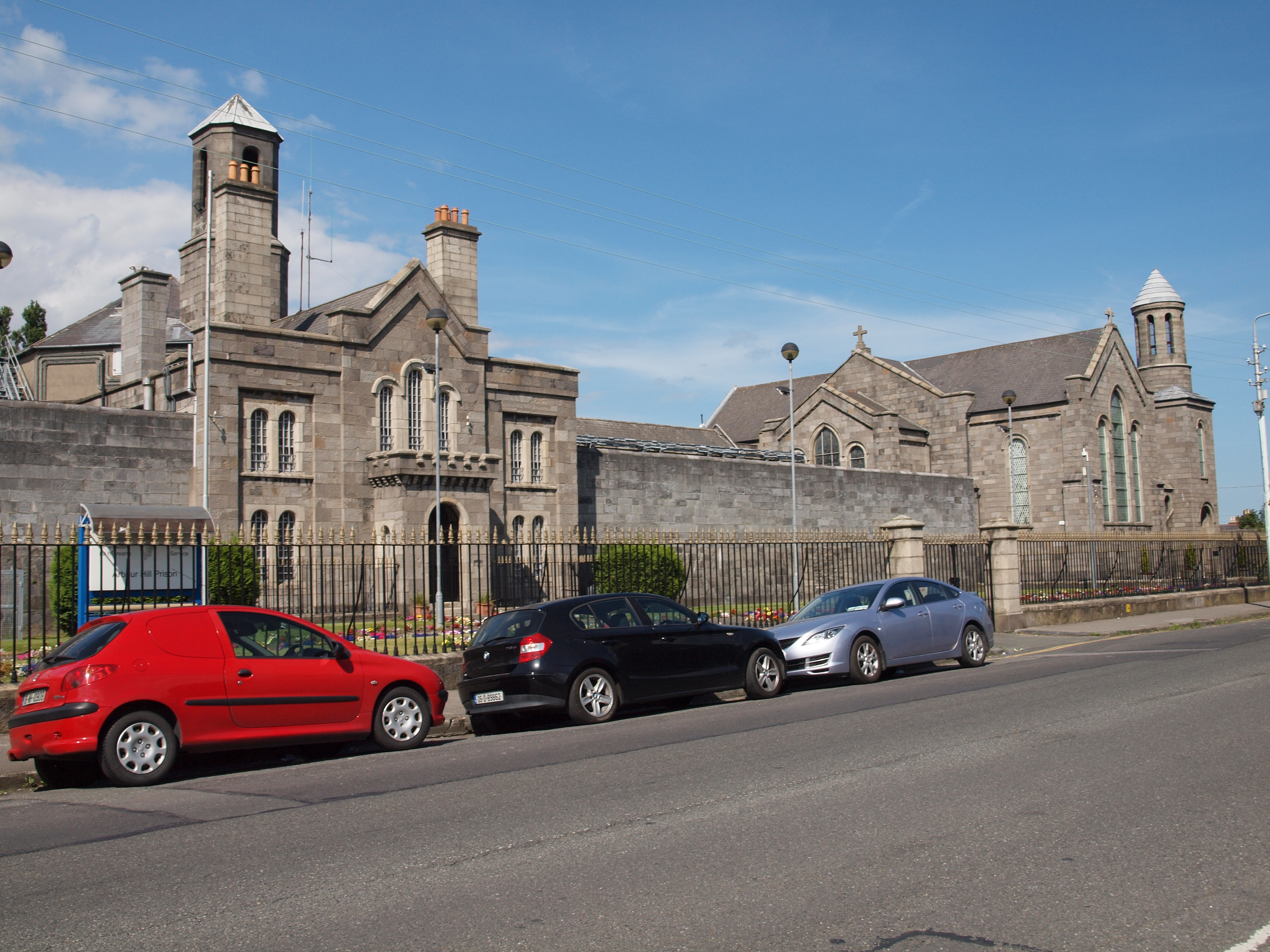
Arbour Hill Prison with Church of the Sacred Heart in the distance

The prison is located on Arbour Hill at the rear of the National Museum of Ireland at Collins Barracks, Dublin 7. The area is also the site of the Arbour Hill Military Barracks.

Bus Route(s): Nos. 37, 39, 39A and 70 from the city centre.

== See also ==
- Prisons in Ireland
