= Wilsford, Lincolnshire =

Village in Lincolnshire, England

Coordinates: 52.97954°N 0.502239°W

Wilsford
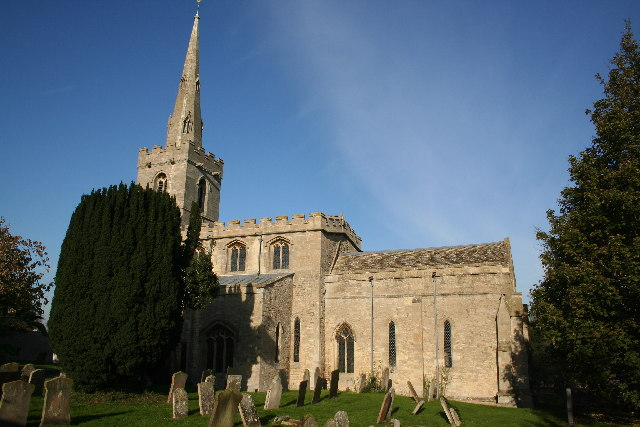
- Wilsford's parish church, dedicated to Saint Mary

- Location within Lincolnshire
- Population: 400 (2011 Census)
- OS grid reference: TF005435
  - London: 105 mi (169 km) SSE
- District: North Kesteven
- Shire county: Lincolnshire
- Region: East Midlands
- Country: England
- Sovereign state: United Kingdom
- Post town: GRANTHAM
- Postcode district: NG32
- Dialling code: 01400
- Police: Lincolnshire
- Fire: Lincolnshire
- Ambulance: East Midlands
- UK Parliament: Grantham and Bourne

Wilsford is a village and civil parish in the North Kesteven district of Lincolnshire, England. The population of the civil parish was 400 at the 2011 census.

== Geography ==
Wilsford is geographically 4 miles (6.4 km) west-south-west of Sleaford, and 7 miles (11 km) north-east of Grantham. According to the 2011 Census the village had a population of 400. Some 9 hectares (22 acres) of the north-eastern part of the village, along Main Street, form a mainly residential conservation area.

Wilsford is located off Ermine Street. The parish of Ancaster lies to the north-west and North and South Rauceby to the north-east. The parish covers about 2,900 acres (12 km^{2}) and includes the eastern edge of the village of Ancaster.

== Heritage ==
Wilsford seems to contains the Old English personal name Wifel + ford (Old English), so 'Wifel's ford'. It appears in the Domesday Book of 1086 as Wivelesforde.

The earliest archaeological evidence of Wilsford consists of Bronze Age and Iron Age artefacts. There are some Romano-British building remains and possibly a cemetery with seven stone coffins to the north of the village. A Roman carved stone relief of a male figure was found at Slate House Farm, west of the village. In 1969, fragments of Romano-British grey ware pottery were found on the Wilsford housing estate site, just opposite the north-east corner of the Roman town of Ancaster.

In the Middle Ages it included a Benedictine priory, founded in the early 13th century but poorly funded. It was secured to the Abbey of Bourne in 1401.

Wilsford Inclosure Act 1774
- Act of Parliament
- Parliament of Great Britain
- Long title: An Act for dividing and enclosing the Common and Open Fields, Meadows, Pastures, Heath, and Waste Grounds, within the Manor and Parish of Willsford, otherwise Willesford, in the County of Lincoln.
- Citation: 14 Geo. 3. c. 35 Pr.
- Territorial extent: Great Britain

Dates
- Royal assent: 31 March 1774
- Commencement: 13 January 1774 (Note: Start of session.)

Status: Current legislation

In the late 17th to early 18th centuries, Wilsford (also referred to as Willesworth) had 60 families, which fell to about 50. The village was enclosed by the Wilsford Inclosure Act 1774. By 1801, the population was only 251, rising to 689 in 1881, but falling to 656 in 1901.

The medieval village of Hanbeck lay in the area of present-day Wilford. It lost population in the early modern period, and by 1856 it was described in White's gazetteer as "only a farm of 400 acres [160 hectares]".

The parish belonged to the historical wapentake of Winnibriggs and Threo.

The disused Ancaster stone (limestone) quarry on scenic Wilsford Heath is now screened by a coppice. The output of the quarry is reflected in the present appearance of the village, with its "attractive limestone buildings with a distinctive church".

== Early buildings ==
The Grade I listed parish church of St Mary, including its tower and spire, dates from the 11th to 15th centuries. It was restored in 1860–1861 by the Sleaford firm of Kirk and Parry. All the fittings are from the 19th century except the 15th-century octagonal font. It currently belongs to the Ancaster Wilford Group of parishes in the Diocese of Lincoln. The incumbent is Canon Mike Cooney.

Wilsford Hall, built in 1649 and enlarged in 1776, was demolished in 1918. The village school and schoolhouse built in 1857 have been converted into a private house.

== Amenities ==
The nearest doctors' surgery is in Ancaster. The nearest school is Ancaster Church of England Primary School, which was rated overall as Good in a January 2017 Ofsted short inspection.

The village hall can also be used for indoor sports, and there is a playing field. The village public house is the Plough Inn in Main Street, which serves meals. Main Street also a pizzeria and a local store that acts as a sub-post office.

The local community supports a Women's Institute branch, a theatre group, a club for the elderly, a horticultural society, horticultural allotments, and a Brownies group for girls aged seven to ten.

== Transport ==
There are two-hourly daytime, weekday buses to Sleaford and Grantham. There are also demand-response minibus services.

The Grantham to Skegness railway line passes close to the north of the village, running alongside the A153 road and crosses the road at a level crossing close to the east. The nearest station is at Ancaster (1.8 miles (2.9 km), which has a six-day-a-week daytime service of three to five trains a day.

The A153 used to go through the village along Main Street before it was bypassed in the 1930s.

== Notable people ==
- Clement Cotterell (died 1631), courtier and MP for Grantham, was lord of the manor of Wilsford.
- Charles Cotterell (1615–1701), son of Clement, master of ceremonies to Charles I of England until the King's execution in 1649, and a literary translator from French and Italian, was born in Wilsford.
