= Charles Jerram =

English evangelical priest

Charles Jerram (1770–1853) was an English evangelical priest of the Church of England.

== Life ==
Born 17 January 1770, in the parish of Blidworth, Nottinghamshire, he was son of Charles Jerram, a farmer; his mother, Mary Knutton, a religious woman of presbyterian descent, was the daughter of a farmer of the same parish. He was placed under the tuition of the Rev. T. Cursham, the curate of Blidworth, of evangelical views, with whom he remained many years, first as pupil and then as assistant teacher.

About 1790 Jerram became assistant at a Unitarian school in Highgate, London. There Alexander Crombie supported his classical studies, but Richard Cecil had more influence on his religious views. His friend Cursham recommended him to the Elland Society of Yorkshire, and he was able in 1793 to enter Magdalene College, Cambridge, where he attended the ministry of Charles Simeon and undergraduate societies. He obtained the Norrisian prize in 1796, graduated B.A. in 1797, and proceeded M.A. in 1800.

In 1797 Jerram took holy orders, and served his first curacy at Long Sutton, Lincolnshire; the parish had had a succession of non-resident vicar. The neighbouring clergy included John Pugh, vicar of Rauceby, at whose house Jerram took part in the discussion which led to the foundation of the Church Missionary Society.

In October 1805 ill-health led Jerram to move to Chobham in Surrey, where Cecil was vicar, and he acted as his curate till Cecil's death in 1810, when he succeeded to the benefice. At Chobham, as at Long Sutton, he prepared private pupils for university, and acquired a reputation as a tutor. He gave up tuition in 1822. Accepted after a while at Chobham, Jerram became a magistrate and became involved in the administration of the Poor Laws, about which he had concerns as leading to pauperism.

About 1824 Jerram left Chobham for St John's Chapel, Bedford Row, though retaining the living. Disliking pew rents, after two years, he returned to Chobham in 1826. Charles Richard Sumner as incoming Bishop of Winchester made him a rural dean, and in April 1834 presented him to the rectory of Witney, Oxfordshire; he held it for the rest of his life and his son succeeded him at Chobham. His predecessor at Witney had been non-resident, and nonconformists flourished in the parish. During Jerram's incumbency the parish church was restored; district churches and schools were erected in two hamlets; Sunday trading was put down, and the parish was divided into districts for systematic visitation.

Jerram's health began to fail in 1844, and on Good Friday 1848 he preached his last sermon in Witney Church. He died 20 June 1853, and was buried at Witney.

== Works ==
Jerram published, as well as sermons and magazine articles:

- Scriptural Grounds for expecting the Restoration of the Jews, 1797, Norrisian essay.
- Review of the Letters of an Universalist, 1802.
- Considerations on the Impotency and Pernicious Tendency of the Administration of the Poor Laws, 1802.
- Letters on the Atonement, 1804; republished, with additions, 1828.
- Conversations on Infant Baptism, 1819.
- Tribute of Parental Affection, 1823.
- Secession from the Church of England, 1836. This was a pamphlet on secessions of evangelical clergymen to the dissenters, and also against Tractarianism.

== Family ==
In 1798 Jerram married Mary Stanger, daughter of a yeoman of Tydd St Mary, Lincolnshire; they had a large family. Two sons, James and Samuel, were in holy orders. The former, rector of Fleet, Lincolnshire, was his biographer.

== Notes ==
Attribution

This article incorporates text from a publication now in the public domain: Lee, Sidney, ed. (1892). "Jerram, Charles". Dictionary of National Biography. Vol. 29. London: Smith, Elder & Co.
