= Ancaster =

Ancaster may refer to:

- Ancaster, Lincolnshire, England
- Ancaster, Ontario, Canada
- Gilbert Heathcote-Drummond-Willoughby, 3rd Earl of Ancaster, last holder of the now-extinct Earldom of Ancaster
- Ancaster (tugboat), one of Canada's museum ships

== See also ==
- Ancaster stone
