= Josiah Pratt =

English evangelical clergyman

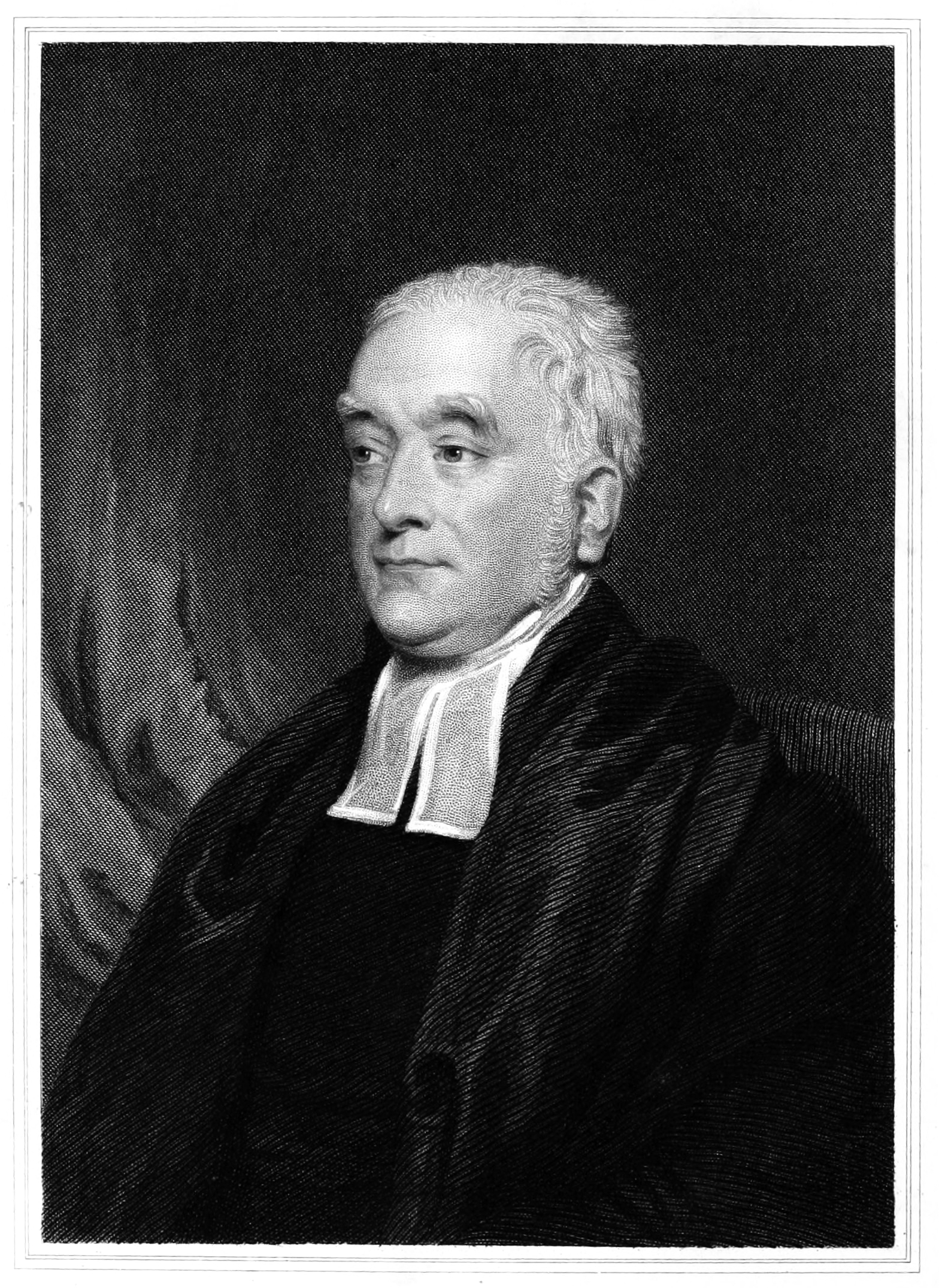
Josiah Pratt, 1849 engraving

Josiah Pratt (1768–1844) was an English evangelical cleric of the Church of England, involved in publications and the administration of missionary work.

== Early life ==
The second son of Josiah Pratt, a Birmingham manufacturer, he was born in that city on 21 December 1768. With his two younger brothers, Isaac and Henry, Josiah was educated at Barr House school, six miles from Birmingham.

When Pratt was 12 years old his father took him into his business; but at age 17 he obtained his father's permission to enter holy orders. After some private tuition, he matriculated on 28 June 1789 at St Edmund Hall, Oxford, at that time the stronghold of evangelicalism in the university. His college tutor was Isaac Crouch; they formed a lifelong friendship. He graduated B.A. and was ordained deacon in 1792, becoming assistant curate to William Jesse, rector of Dowles, near Bewdley.

== Priest ==
Pratt remained at Dowles until 1795, when, on receiving priest's orders, he became assistant minister under Richard Cecil, the evangelical minister of St John's Chapel, Bedford Row.

On 7 September 1797 he married and settled at 22 Doughty Street. There he received pupils, among them being Daniel Wilson, with whom he became close friends. In 1799, at a meeting of the Eclectic Society, which met in the vestry of St John's, he argued for a periodical publication. The first number of the Christian Observer appeared in January 1802 under his editorship. After six weeks he resigned the editorship to Zachary Macaulay.

Pratt also took part in the meetings of the Eclectic (18 March and 12 April 1799) at which the Church Missionary Society was effectively founded. On 8 December 1802 he was elected secretary of the missionary society in succession to Thomas Scott. He kept the post for more than 21 years. From 1813 to 1815 he travelled through England for the society. He took part in the establishment of a seminary at Islington for the training of missionaries, which was planned in 1822, and opened by him in 1825. On 23 April 1824, he resigned his post to Edward Bickersteth, assistant secretary. He set up the Missionary Register, of which the first number appeared in January 1813.

Pratt also helped to form the British and Foreign Bible Society in 1804; he was one of the original committee, and was its first Church of England secretary, but then retired in favour of John Owen. In 1811 he was elected a life-governor, and in 1812 he helped to frame the rules for the organisation of auxiliary and branch societies, and of bible associations.

In 1804 Pratt left Cecil to become lecturer at St Mary Woolnoth, Lombard Street, where John Newton, another evangelical leader, whose health was failing, was rector. Next year he became Newton's regular assistant curate. In 1804 he also undertook two other lectureships, the evening lecture at Spitalfields Church, and Lady Campden's lecture at St Lawrence Jewry. In 1810 he was made by Hastings Wheler the incumbent of the chapel of Sir George Wheler—the Wheler Chapel—in Spital Square, which had been shut up for some time. For 16 years he stayed there and set up the Spitalfields Benevolent Society; among his congregation were Samuel Hoare Jr of Hampstead and Thomas Fowell Buxton. Buxton with others left the Society of Friends, and were baptised into the Church of England.

Pratt worked to promoting the church establishment in India, encouraging Claudius Buchanan, and urging the Church Missionary Society to give practical aid when Thomas Fanshaw Middleton was appointed bishop of Calcutta. In 1820 Pratt corresponded with two American bishops, Alexander Viets Griswold and William White, and welcomed Philander Chase, bishop of Ohio, on his visit to England; and it was partly through his efforts that an American missionary society was established. He also supported in the mission of his brother-in-law William Jowett to Malta and the Levant, and founded with Buchanan the Malta mission.

== St Stephen's, Coleman Street ==
In 1826, when Pratt was 58, he at last became a beneficed clergyman. The parishioners of St Stephen's, Coleman Street, who elected their own vicar, had chosen him their vicar as early as 1823; legal difficulties last three years. He retained his lectureship at St Mary Woolnoth until 1831. He established Christian and benevolent institutions in St. Stephen's parish, opposed the Oxford Movement, and took part in the formation of the Church Pastoral Aid Society.

Pratt remained a prominent leader of the evangelicals. Alexander Knox described a meeting with him at Hannah More's, and called him "a serious, well-bred, well-informed gentleman, an intimate friend of Mrs. More's and Mr. Wilberforce's." He died in London on 10 October 1844, and was buried in the vault in the church of St Stephen's, Coleman Street.

== Works ==
Pratt published:

- A Prospectus, with Specimens, of a new Polyglot Bible for the use of English Students (1797). This was a scheme for popularising the work of Brian Walton. The British Critic attacked it for presumption, and nothing came of it.
- The works of Joseph Hall (10 vols. 1808)
- The works of Ezekiel Hopkins (4 vols. 1809)
- Richard Cecil's Remains (1810) and his Works (4 vols. 1811)
- Propaganda, being an Abstract of the Designs and Proceedings of the Society for the Propagation of the Gospel in Foreign Parts, with Extracts from the Annual Sermons. By a Member of the Society, (1818)
- A Collection of Psalms and Hymns, 750 in number, for the use of his parishioners in public worship, of which 52,000 copies were sold; and another Collection for private and social use.

== Family ==
By his wife Elizabeth, whom he married in 1797, eldest daughter of John Jowett of Newington, Pratt was father of Josiah, his successor at St. Stephen's; and of John Henry Pratt, Archdeacon of Calcutta and geologist.
