= Rauceby =

Rauceby may refer to:

- North Rauceby, in Lincolnshire, England
- South Rauceby, in Lincolnshire, England
- Rauceby railway station, nearer to South Rauceby
