= Curtis Philip Berry =

Jamaican politician

Curtis Philip Berry (c. 1786 - 1837-40) was the owner of the Trinity estate in Manchester Parish, Jamaica, and a slave-owner. He was an architect by profession and also served as a magistrate. He was elected to the House of Assembly of Jamaica in 1820.

It was claimed by The Christian Observer that he branded his initials C.P.B. on the shoulders and breast of one of his slaves.
