= Richard Johnson (chaplain) =

English clergyman (1755–1827)

The Reverend Richard Johnson
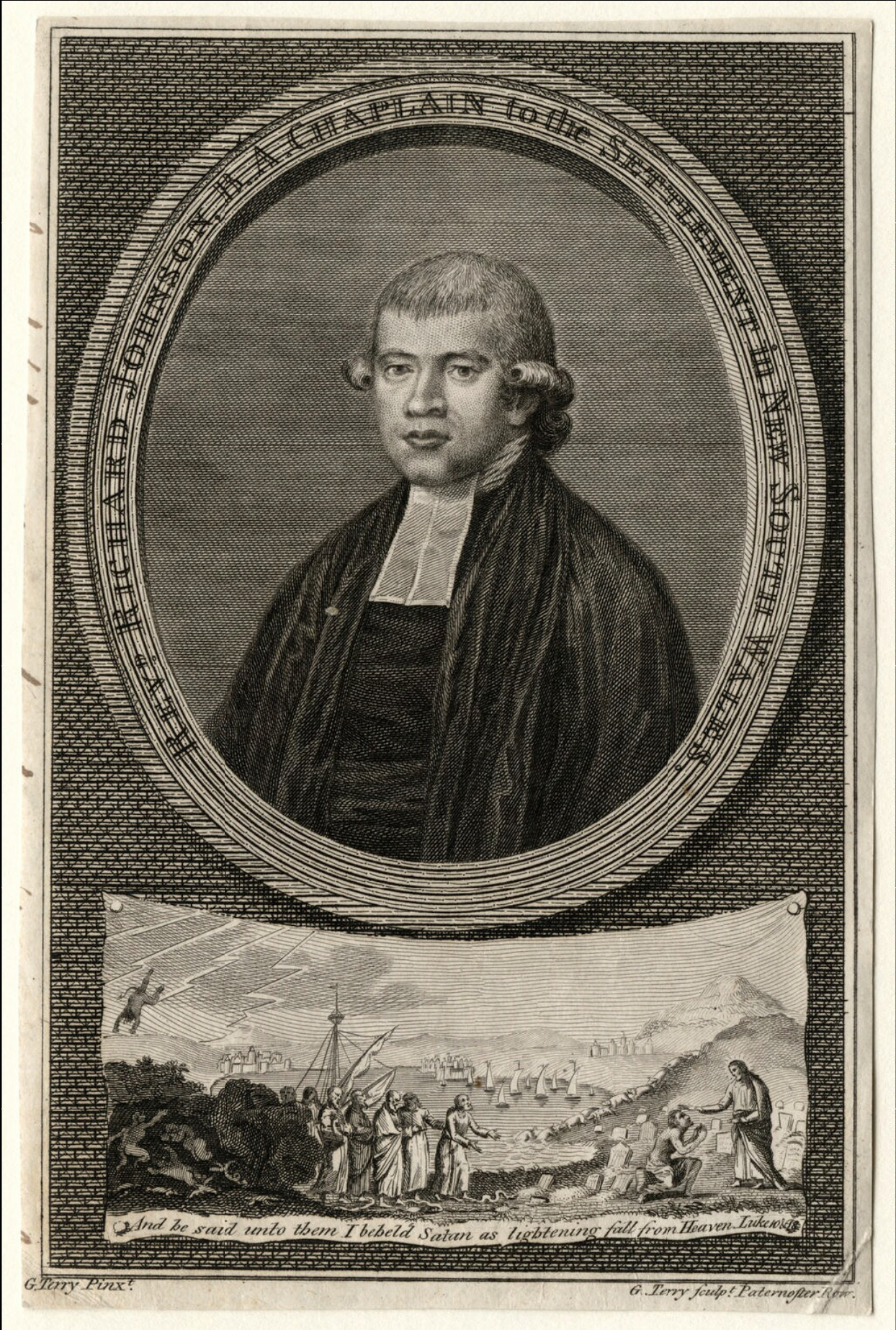
- Portrait by Garnet Terry, 1787
- Born: c. 1755; Welton, East Riding of Yorkshire
- Died: 13 March 1827 (aged 70–71)
- Education: Magdalene College, Cambridge
- Spouse: Mary Burton
- Church: Church of England
- Ordained: 1784

Richard Johnson (c. 1755 – 13 March 1827) was an English clergyman who was the first Christian cleric in Australia.

== Early life ==
Johnson was born c. 1755, in Welton, East Riding of Yorkshire, to John and Mary Johnson. He was educated at Hull Grammar School under Joseph Milner. In 1780 he entered Magdalene College, Cambridge as a sizar and graduated in 1784. His first post was as curate of Boldre, where William Gilpin was vicar. After about a year in Boldre, Johnson moved to London to work as assistant to Henry Foster, an itinerant evangelical preacher.

== Life in New South Wales ==
Johnson was appointed chaplain of the prison colony at New South Wales in 1786. This appointment was due, in large part, to the influence of the Eclectic Society and two notable men, John Newton and William Wilberforce, who were keen for a committed evangelical Christian to take the role of chaplain in the colony.

At the time, it was thought preferable for a missionary or clergyman to marry before travelling to a new country and so Johnson married Mary Burton, an Anglican but later described by Johnson as "about half a Baptist and half a Methodist". It is thought the marriage was arranged or encouraged by John Newton. Johnson and his wife Mary sailed with the First Fleet and arrived in Australia in 1788. This means that Mary Johnson was the first free woman to land in New South Wales on the First Fleet.

In addition to guiding the spiritual life of convicts, soldiers and settlers in the new colony, Johnson was charged with providing education to the convicts. At the first Christian service held at Sydney Cove on Sunday, 3 February 1788, Johnson took as his text Psalm 116:12-13:

What shall I render unto the Lord
for all his benefits towards me?
I will take the cup of salvation,
and call upon the name of the Lord.

In May 1789, the Johnsons took into their home an indigenous girl aged about 15, called Araboo or Boorong, who had survived the 1789 Sydney smallpox outbreak. She learned some English and some Western customs and visited the Johnsons after returning to her own people.

In 1790, he and Mary had a daughter, who was given the Aboriginal name Milbah. They also had a son in 1792.

In early 1793, Johnson cared for the ill chaplain of Malaspina's Spanish expedition, Fr José de Mesa, with, according to the expedition's journal, "a kindness, spirit of unity and a simplicity that were truly of the Gospel”.

Johnson, with his wife Mary, taught between 150 and 200 school children in this church.

== Return to England and later life ==
After returning to England, in about August 1801 Johnson took up a curacy with the Reverend Thomas Dykes of St John's, Kingston-upon-Hull. During this time he had opportunity to influence William Cowper, who became the third chaplain to New South Wales after being recruited by Samuel Marsden. In November 1803, Johnson was curate at Bunwell, Norfolk, a position he occupied until he moved to West Thurrock, Essex, in April 1809. In 1810, he was presented by the king to the united parishes of St Antholin and St John Baptist, in London. He never served as a curate at Ingham, despite oft-repeated claims to the contrary. The Richard Johnson who served at Ingham was a different person.

Johnson continued to take an interest in Australia, appearing before the House of Commons Select Committee on Transportation in 1812 and in 1815 he recommended John Youl to be chaplain at Port Dalrymple. He died on 13 March 1827, aged 70 or 71.

== See also ==
- Journals of the First Fleet
- Richard Johnson Anglican School
- From These Ashes
