= John Worgan =

Organist and composer (1724 - 1790)

John Worgan (1724–1790) was an organist and composer of Welsh descent. He is best known for playing the organ at Vauxhall Gardens, the London public pleasure garden in the mid 18th century.

== Life ==
Worgan was born in London in 1724. He was one of six children to John Worgan and Mary Lambert. Their father was a surveyor of Welsh or Cambrian ancestry.

He graduated with a bachelor's degree in music at St John's College, Cambridge in 1748, and gained a doctorate in 1775.

Worgan married three times over his lifetime. He married, firstly, Sarah Mackelcan at St Peter le Poer, London, in 1753. He had nine children with his wife; among whom was George Bouchier Worgan (bapt. 3 May 1757 at St Andrew's Church, Holborn), who was the naval surgeon on board the H.M.S. Sirius in the First Fleet to Australia, and Charlotte Sophia Worgan (bapt. 2 September 1761 at St Andrew's, Holborn) who married (at St Mary's church, Marylebone, in 1778) (Sir) Charles Parsons (d. 1817), later Master of the King's Band. Worgan obtained an Act of Parliament (9 Geo. 3. c. 57) in 1769 to divorce his wife for her adultery. He married, secondly, Eleanor Baston in 1770 (at St Andrew's, Holborn). He had two more children with Eleanor, the elder of whom was Thomas Danvers Worgan, subsequently a musicologist. He married, thirdly, Martha Cooke, a widow, in 1779 at St Mary, Aldermanbury.

John Worgan died at age 66 at Gower Street on 24 August 1790 after "an operation for the stone." He was buried at St. Andrew Undershaft on 31 August. One of his favourite pupils, Charles Wesley (1757–1834), presided at the organ.

A grandson, George Worgan (bapt. 18 January 1803 at St James's church, Chipping Campden, died 2 Apr 1888 at Tinakori Road, Wellington, New Zealand), was a musician of sufficient calibre to warrant a notice in the Musical Times upon his death. George was an organist and pianoforte teacher, with a roster of students that included musicians' children and English nobility. After retiring around 1850, he emigrated to New Zealand, where he raised sheep and taught music until his death at age 86.

== Organist ==
John became a pupil of his brother, James, with instruction in harpsichord and organ. James Worgan (1715–1753) was an organist and cello player, including at Vauxhall Gardens from 1737 to 1751. John subsequently studied under organist Thomas Roseingrave and musical theorist/composer Francesco Geminiani. He also greatly admired the work of Domenico Scarlatti.

John Worgan became a skilful organist with many appointments. He succeeded his brother James as organist at St Andrew Undershaft with St Mary Axe in 1749; at Vauxhall Gardens, in 1751; and at St. Botolph, Aldgate, upon his brother's death in 1753. (Their sister Mary succeeded James as the organist at St Dunstan-in-the-East.) He subsequently became organist of St. John's Chapel, Bedford Row in 1760. He held the post of "composer" to Vauxhall Gardens from 1753 to 1761, and again from 1770 to 1774.

He also acted as music editor for a number of his contemporaries. British composer Harriet Wainwright was one of his students.

Worgan was a founder of the Royal Society of Musicians of Great Britain.

== Compositions ==
John Worgan's compositions include two oratorios: Hannah (King's Theatre, Haymarket, 3 April 1, 1764) and Manasseh (Lock Hospital Chapel, 30 April 1766); 'We will rejoice in Thy salvation,' a thanksgiving anthem for victories (29 Nov 1759); many songs for Vauxhall Gardens, of which thirteen books (at least) were published; psalm tunes, glees, organ music, and sonatas and other pieces for the harpsichord. Some of his manuscripts are in the British Library (Add MSS 31670, 31693, 34609 and 35038).

Worgan is persistently credited with having composed the Easter hymn 'Christ the Lord Is Risen Today.' The tune, however, appeared anonymously in Lyra Davidica (1708), sixteen years before Worgan was born.

== Tributes ==
Four tributes demonstrated Worgan's traits as an organist, whose performances attracted crowds both of various positions:

- George Frideric Handel said: "Mr. Worgan shall sit by me; he plays my music very well at Vauxhall."
- Richard Cecil wrote: "Admiration and feeling are very distinct from each other. Some music and oratory enchant and astonish, but they speak not to the heart... Dr. Worgan has so touched the organ at St. John's that I have been turning backward and forward over the prayer-book for the first lesson in Isaiah and wondered that I could not find Isaiah there!".
- Martin Madan, in a satirical song upon Joah Bates, issued anonymously, and set to music by Samuel Wesley, entitled 'The Organ laid open, &c.,' placed him as a player upon an equality with Handel: "Let Handel or Worgan go thresh at the organ".
- Burney refers to him as "a very masterly and learned fugueist on the organ."

== Recordings ==
- Complete Harpsichord Music, played by Julian Perkins and Timothy Roberts (Toccata Classics)
- Complete Organ Music, played by Timothy Roberts (Toccata Classics)
