= Eclectic Society =

Eclectic Society may refer to:

- Eclectic Society (Christian), founded in 1783 by Anglican clergymen and laymen as a discussion group
- Eclectic Society (fraternity), began in 1838 as a college fraternity at Wesleyan University in Middletown, Connecticut, United States
