= Sudbrook =

Sudbrook may refer to:

- Sudbrook, Lincolnshire, England
- Sudbrook, Monmouthshire, Wales
- Sudbrook Park, Pikesville, Maryland, U.S.A.
- Sudbrook Park and Sudbrook House, Petersham, England
- Sudbrook (stream), London

== See also ==
- Sudbrooke, Lincolnshire
