= Lionel Brown =

English cricketer (1872–1938)

Personal information
- Full name: Lionel George Brown
- Born: 24 April 1872; Ancaster, Lincolnshire, England
- Died: 16 December 1938 (aged 66); Chapel and Hill Chorlton, Staffordshire, England
- Batting: Right-handed
- Role: Wicket-keeper

Domestic team information
- Years: Team
- 1902–1903: Bedfordshire
- 1901: Berkshire
- 1895–1900: Bedfordshire
- 1892: Oxford University

Career statistics
Competition	First-class
Matches	1
Runs scored	22
Batting average	11.00
100s/50s	–/–
Top score	14
Balls bowled	–
Wickets	–
Bowling average	–
5 wickets in innings	–
10 wickets in match	–
Best bowling	–
Catches/stumpings	1/–
- Source: Cricinfo, 9 December 2011

Lionel George Brown (23 April 1872 – 16 December 1938) was an English cricketer. Brown was a right-handed batsman who fielded as a wicket-keeper. He was born at Ancaster, Lincolnshire and educated at Bedford Modern School and Merton College, Oxford.

Brown made a single first-class appearance for Oxford University against the Gentlemen of England at University Parks in 1892. In his match, he scored 8 runs in the university's first-innings, before being dismissed by Sammy Woods, while in their second-innings he was dismissed by John Ferris for 14 runs. The Gentlemen of England won the match by 10 wickets. Having played miscellaneous matches for Bedfordshire from 1891, Brown proceeded to make his Minor Counties Championship debut for the county against Wiltshire. He made five further appearances to 1900, before playing two matches for Berkshire in the 1901 Minor Counties Championship against Oxfordshire and Monmouthshire. He later made two appearances in the Minor Counties Championship for Bedfordshire, against Oxfordshire in 1902 and Cambridgeshire in 1903.

He died at Chorlton, near Stoke-on-Trent, Staffordshire, on 16 December 1938.
