= Clan Strachan =

Scottish clan

- Strathaen
- Motto: Non Timeo Sed Caveo (I fear not, but am cautious)
- War cry: Clachnaben!

Profile
- Region: Aberdeenshire
- District: Strachan, Aberdeenshire

Chief
- Charles Robert Lund (Rob) Strachan

Clan Strachan is a Scottish clan originating from the barony (now village) of Strachan, in Aberdeenshire. As of 31 July 2024, the Clan Strachan Family Convention concluded with unanimous consent to recognise Charles Robert Lund (Rob) Strachan, Mill of Strachan, Strachan, Aberdeenshire, as heritable Chief of the Name and Arms.

The Clan Strachan warcry is Clachnaben!

== Highland or Lowland Clan? ==
The Highland Boundary Fault is a geologic fault that traverses Scotland from Arran and Helensburgh on the west coast to Stonehaven in the east. It separates two distinctly different physiographic regions: the Highlands from the Lowlands, but in most places it is only recognisable as a change in topography.

The village of Strachan (Strachan, Aberdeenshire) is located some 15 miles northwest of Stonehaven, 3 miles outside of Banchory, north and adjacent to the Highland Boundary Fault. Therefore, the Barony of Strachan is located within the Highland Region.

The lands of Strachan, including neighbouring Birse and Durris (RMS, ii, no. 251; and Rotuli Scotiae, i, p 10; Skene, 1890), as well as the Howe O' Mearns fell under the demesne of the Mormaer of the Mearns, Máel Petair of Mearns. His name means "tonsured one of (Saint) Peter". One source tells us that Máel Petair was the son of a Máel Coluim. His name occurs in many sources because he was the man who, in 1094, is often credited for the murder of King Duncan II of Scotland. Most historians agree that King Edgar, the brother and heir of Duncan II confiscated Máel Petair's mormaerdom, and converted it to crown lands. By mid-13th century, virtually all of the Mearns were converted to thanages. (Grant, 1998; Broun, 2015; and Early Sources, ii, pp 90).

Clan Strachan should most appropriately be classified (during the medieval period) as "a Lowland Family (or House) residing within the Highland Region". This was not uncommon as, for example, the Name of Gordon, Fraser and others fall within this same classification.

== History ==
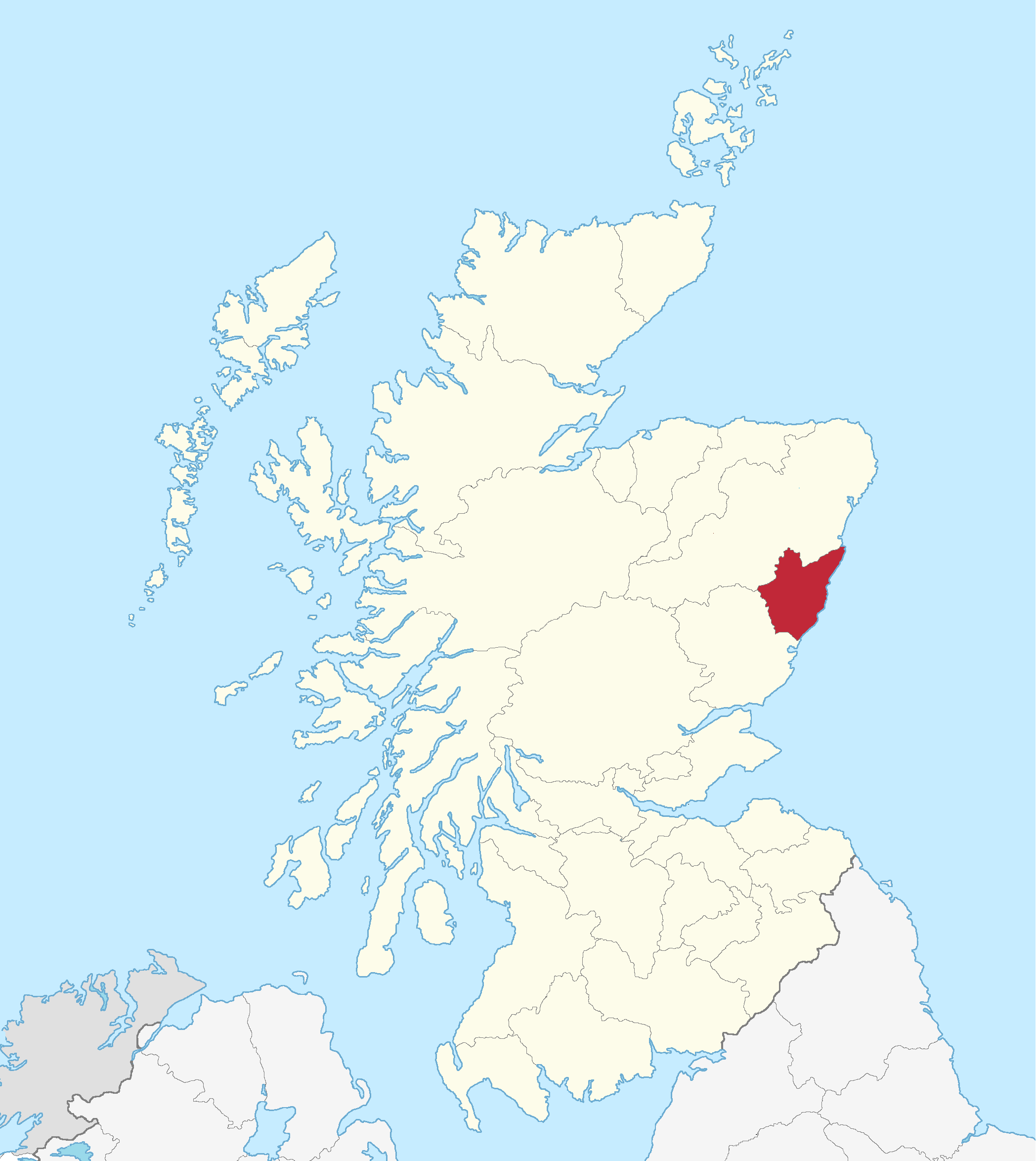
Map of Scotland showing the district of Kincardineshire, where the Strachans of Thornton lived

=== Origins ===
'The Strachans are a good old race, about whom a great amount of misconception and misstatement has already been printed' (Herald and Genealogist, viii, pg. 302). This is as true today, as when it was first printed in 1874.

This surname of Strachan is local as others of the greatest antiquity and has been according to ancient custom taken from lands. (GC, ii, 265)

As the Strachan surname is considered a "local" or "territorial" name it is merely an indication of where the individual came from, and it cannot be assumed that people with the surname are necessarily ancestors.

The Village of Strachan is located some 20 miles southwest of Aberdeen, in the Royal Deeside Grampian Highlands of Scotland.

The District of Strachan is about twenty miles in length, extending from the confines of the parish of Durris, on the east; to Mount Battock, on the west; and is twelve miles in breadth, from Cairn-o'-Mount, in the south, to the river Dee, which constitutes its northern boundary, and separates it from the parish of Banchory-Ternan. It encompasses 56,362 acres. (Topographical Dictionary of Scotland, ii, pp. 504–5)

Through the District of Strachan run the Waters of the Dye, the Avon (pronounced: /an/), and Feugh (pronounced: /few-ich/, guttural for the 'ch', as in loch). The first are tributaries to the latter, which falls into the Dee at Banchory-Teran, where the channel, wild and rocky, shaded by mountain pine, birch, and copsewood, presents a singularly romantic appearance. (Jervise p. 4)

The name of STRACHAN is derived from three Gaelic words:

- The Gaelic word "strath" meaning "broad valley;"
- The main burn (or river) running through the village of Strachan is the Waters of the Feugh (today pronounced /few-ich/ with a guttural for the 'ch'). The word Feugh, some suggest, is similar to the word Fiddich, derived from the Gaelic word Fiadh/Féidh - which is a generic word for deer. The cartographer Timothy Pont, in about 1583x1614 (Lower Deeside), renders the name Feugh as 'Feuich.' Important to note, in the Gaelic, the 'f' disappears in the genitive; and
- The word for 'river' in Gaelic is abhainn. In the Lower Deeside and parts of Speyside, the word is pronounced /awn/, like lawn.

Early medieval phonetic spellings confirm the word STRACHAN was originally a three-syllable word, /strath-euch-an/ or /strath-ich-an/ (the 'ch' pronounced with a guttural, similar to the word loch). Hence, the original meaning of STRACHAN was, Valley of the Deer River. The actual spelling of "Strachan" is not first seen until the 17th century.

The main achievement on Strachan coats of arms are a stag, and therefore, would be referred to as canting arms.

Today, there are two equally proper pronunciations of the Name:

- /stra-khan/ (guttural for the 'ch'): More commonly used in Scotland and England. Popularised during the Scottish Industrial Revolution.
- /strawn/ or /struan/: More popular abroad, almost exclusively used by families who migrated overseas before ~ 1850.

=== Charter History of the House of Strachan ===
In c.1189-95, the lands of Strachan were erected into a barony by King William the Lion who granted it to William Gifford of Lethington (in the barony of Yester, ELO) in feu and in forest with permanent and hereditary rights for a payment of 9 merks annually every Pentecost, and another payment of sixty shillings at the Feast of St. Martin (RRS, ii, no. 340). Simply, the lands of Strachan were held by the Crown 'in forest.' According to the grant, 'No one is to cut timber or hunt without his [i.e., the baron of Strachan’s] license on pain of the king’s forfeiture of £10.' As this clause confirms, the baron of Strachan held forest rights.

Charter evidence also suggests, with a very high probability, and a virtual certainty, that William Gifford was succeeded in the barony of Strachan by Ranulf (de Strachan) between 1202-1211 (St A. Lib., 276-7). Since there is no charter confirming the Strachan family took possession of the barony of Strachan, it is with a high probability the 'de Strachan' family obtained the barony through marriage. During this period, inherited lands would not necessarily be confirmed by a Crown charter.

Ranulf de Strachan also held lands in Brectulach located in Angus (NGR NO 570 470), or to the lesser probability Forfar (NGR NO 470 400).(Arbroath Liber, i, no. 306; Ash, St Andrews, App. 7, no. 2; and Brechin Registrum, ii, no. 1) There is also moderate to high probability he also held lands in Fife (i.e., Beath Waldeve).

As the name 'Ranulf' suggests, the baronial House of Strachan were not of Highland, or even Scottish ancestry. The Strachans, similar to the Gifford family, were of Anglo-Norman descent, and with a moderate to high probability descendants from Waltheof, Ealdorman of Bamburgh (fl. 900).

Waltheof de Strachan succeeded Ranulf, and in c.1230, granted the priory of St. Andrews in Fife, forest rights (i.e., to hunt, cut timber, and graze livestock) in Blarkerocch, which is located within the barony of Strachan. The phonetic spelling of 'Blarkerocch' is best translated "Blarcharnoch" - which means "the moor field with the Cairn". This description fits the landscape of Bucharn Farm, in the village of Strachan (NGR NO659930), in which lay a Bronze Age burial cairn. This cairn is approximately 1 km north of Castlehill of Strachan. (St A. Lib., 276-7)

In 1230-1240, Sir Waldeve de Strachechin witnessed an undated charter which is translated as follows: Alicia (or Alice), daughter of John, son of Ranulph, with the consent of her son and heir John, has given, granted and by this her present charter established to Blessed Queen Margaret and Dunfermline Abbey, in free, pure and perpetual alms, six acres of land with toft and croft in the villa of Cramond 'of the Scots' (MLO)… in free and perpetual alms.(Dunf. Reg. no 202)

The cartulary also suggest with a high probability that the Strachan Family had married into the de Quincy family (c. 1196-1264) (DR, no. 154; RRS, ii, no. 396; DR, no. 86). Elizabeth de Quincy married Alexander Comyn, Earl of Buchan, and if the thesis of a family blood-tie is accurate, it would have made the Strachan family blood related to the Alexander and Elizabeth's son, John Comyn, Earl of Buchan.

In 1264, Ranulf de Strachan was appointed Viscount (Sheriff) of Banffshire (a county North of Aberdeenshire) in succession of Alexander Comyn, the Earl of Buchan. (Exchequer Rolls i, p 15). This may support the thesis that Strachan of that Ilk were related to the Alexander Comyn, Earl of Buchan, possibly through his wife, Elizabeth de Quincy. Sheriffdoms were generally thought to be hereditary. (Grant. Medieval Scotland, p. 57)

In 1268, Elizabeth, Countess of Buchan, formally endorsed the appointment of Ranulph and Michael de Strachan, and William Comyn, named 'the Black' (probably the brother of the Earl of Badenoch and cousin of the Earl of Buchan), to receive her property on her behalf. (CDS / BAIN, i, 2509, 2513)

=== Wars of Independence ===
The Strachan family, holding crown lands, were no doubt beholding to the sovereign and would have supported the King of Scotland, and his heirs. This being King John Balliol in 1292. When Robert the Bruce murdered Red Comyn at the altar at Grayfriars Abbey, the new heir to the throne of Scotland was John Comyn, Earl of Buchan. Strachan of that Ilk, as mentioned, was likely blood-kin of John Comyn.

Bruce forces likely burned-out a timber fortress in Strachan, now called Castlehill of Strachan during the early summer of 1308 (Yeoman). Comyn, and his loyal supporters which likely included Clan Strachan, were defeated at the Battle of Inverurie (1308). After the Battle of Bannockburn (1314), the Strachans were disinherited by Robert the Bruce and the lands of Strachan were granted to Sir Alexander Fraser, thane of Cowie (1316).

Before 1325, Alexander Strachan, son and heir of John Strachan of that Ilk, and his wife Christina, daughter of Maule of Panmure, was granted by Maule all his land of Carmyllie, his whole land of Drumnadych, his whole land of Hacwrangdrom, half his land of Lochlair, the mill, the grain, Strathyis Copresille (ANG) … with all their just pertinents, correct bounds, etc.

The battle of Neville’s Cross took place to the west of Durham, England, on 17 October 1346. King David of Scotland – son and heir of Robert the Bruce – was wounded in the face by two arrows, and eventually captured. Both Alexander Strachan (spelt Straghern) and his son died fighting alongside of the Earl of Buchan, and all of whom serving in the same division under the direct command of King David of Scotland.

Around 1350, many of the families that benefited from Robert the Bruce confiscations and disinheritance rushed to make amends with promises of noble marriages and grants of land. During this period, five new Houses of Strachan were formed: Knock, Glenkindie, Thornton, Lenturk, and a barony in Aberdeenshire.

=== 17th-18th century: Civil war and a split in family loyalties ===
Sir Alexander Strachan of Thornton obtained the Baronet of Nova Scotia from Charles I in 1625. The baronetcy passed to a distant relative, Sir James Strachan of Inchtuthill. Sir James, minister of Keith, is believed to be from the senior line of Monboddo by a charter under the great seal in 1663.

In 1683, Sir James sold the Mains and Estate of Thornton to his wife's father (Robert Forbes). Some debate exists as to whether the sale was due to a financial over encumbrance, or fear that a more senior claim might be made.

The elder Sir James, continued his ministry at Keith until he was deprived of his living by the Privy Council in 1689, because he refused to pray for William III of England and Mary II of England, but instead prayed for the restoration of James II of England. Sir James Strachan (the elder) died at Inverness in 1715.

His son and heir, also named Sir James entrusted their three daughters and their tutorship to the father of his wife, Barbara Forbes' father. Sir James joined the Highland force that Calverhouse, for the Viscount Dundee, in support of the deposed King James II. It is thus apparent the Royalist sentiments passed from father to son. On 27 July 1689 Bonnie Dundee’s Highlanders met and defeated General Mackay’s army at the Battle of Killiecrankie. Unfortunately, Dundee, and the rising hope of the Jacobite cause, was slain in the hour of its own victory. Among the highland dead, was also James Strachan, younger of Thornton.

The kinsmen of Strachan of Thornton, Alexander Strachans of Glenkindie was known as the 'Great Covenanter' (d.c. 1674). This allegiance to the government was passed down to his grandson, Sir Patrick was imprisoned by the Jacobites during the first Rebellion in 1715, and on his release he appears to have been very active in the disarming of the country.

By 1746, at the Battle of Culloden all Houses of Strachan were extinct except for the Representor of Thornton who was now residing in London. Strachan was a broken clan by this time, and progressive generations of this surviving line had begun failing in the male line. At Culloden, there are a number of Strachans who are recorded in the ranks of the Jacobites. The remains of John Strachan has been identified at Culloden, and is in the ranks of the Jacobites. John Strachan is listed among the dead at Culloden Centre at the exit from the battle field film exhibit.

=== Napoleonic Wars ===
Arms of the Clan Strachan Society

In the 19th century, during the Napoleonic Wars, Admiral Sir Richard Strachan, 6th baronet from the direct line of the chieftainship of the Clan Strachan, commanded a squadron. On 2 November 1805, his squadron engaged four French battleships that had escaped from Lord Nelson's triumph at the Battle of Trafalgar. Sir Richard captured all four French vessels with little loss of British life. He was created a Knight of the Bath and in 1810 was granted freedom of the City of London. Sir Richard died in 1829 without male heir.

=== Present day ===
The last chief of Clan Strachan was one Admiral Sir Richard John Strachan (Bart.), RN, who died in 1828. As he was without male heir, his title and the baronetcy became dormant in 1854.

As mentioned above Clan Strachan Society held a Family Convention (Ad Hoc Derbhfine) in 2014 to recognize a new Commander for Clan Strachan, Rob Strachan, Mill of Strachan, Strachan, Aberdeenshire. The Commander will likely become the hereditary Chief of Clan Strachan after waiting 10 years. This 'waiting period' is to determine if a more legitimate claimant to the Chiefdom comes forth with a documented blood line (found satisfactory to the Lord Lyon) that proves descent from the past Chief (or a cadet branch therein). A person with documented blood line to the past Chief (or a cadet branch) would have a priority claim for the Chiefship. As no one in 186+ years has come forth to claim the Strachan Chiefship, it is expected the appointed Commander (Rob Strachan, Mill of Strachan) will eventually become the recognized and legal hereditary Chief of Clan Strachan.

The Clan Strachan Society in July 2012 was issued a new Grant of Arms by the Lord Lyon. The Society is therefore recognized as an Armigerous Society, an 'indeterminant cadet' [Innes]. According to Innes, an Armigerous Clan Society as a corporate Armiger is responsible to act as the economic and business affairs arm of the clan, subordinate to the Chief.

Armorial description of the Society Arms:

Azure, a hart trippant Or attired and ungulled Gules in chief three annulets conjoined in fess Or.

"Crest issuant from a celestial crown Purpure a demi-hart rampant Or attired and ungulled Gules charged with a saltire Argent and in its mouth a California Poppy Proper."

== Clan Castles ==
Clan Strachan Tartan – designed in 1987, by Tony Murray. According to Kenneth Dalgliesh (Scottish World Tartan Society) it was first seen in 1999, and was registered in 2000.

- Castlehill of Strachan: Located in the village of Strachan. Occupied from about 1250 to the early summer of 1308, when it was burned-out and destroyed by forces loyal to Robert de Bruce.
- Glenkindie House: Adam Strachan was granted lands in Aberdeenshire from William Keith (1350). William Keith had inherited the barony of Strachan through his mother, the daughter of Sir Alexander Fraser and niece of King Robert I. Adam Strachan also married the niece of Thomas, Earl of Mar, Margaret Mar, and gained the lands and baronetcy of Glenkindie. As a result of this marriage between the Strachan of Glenkindie and the Earldom of Mar, Strachans may wear the Tribe of Mar tartan. Additionally, as the Earldom of Mar were related to the King Robert the Bruce, descendants from this marriage would no doubt have royal blood.
- House of Thornton: In 1348, seven years before Adam Strachan obtained Glenkindie, a Sir James Strachan of Monboddo married Agnete, heiress of the Barony of Thornton, which had been granted to her father by Robert I in 1309. From thenceforth, the Strachans of Thornton and the Strachans of Glenkindie became the two principal chieftains of the Strachan family. Thornton Castle lies about 15 miles to the south of the village of Strachan and Glenkindie House lies about 30 miles to its north.
- House of Carmyllie: Alexander de Strachan granted the barony of Carmylie in Forfarshire (1347) by Sir Henry Maule of Panmure. Also received the lands of Drummayeth, Hackmangerum, Acheyclare, and Moncur.
- House of Lenturk: Sir John de Strachan was granted the barony of Lenturk in Aberdeenshire (1350 possibly by the Earl of Mar, as his lands were situated quite near to the Earl of Mar's fortress, (Kildrummy Castle). In 1359, Sir John became Viscount (Sheriff) of Forfarshire. In official documents of the time, he is listed as a witness to the installation of John of Mar as Bishop of Aberdeen and, to another charter, as co-witness with William Keith, the Earl Marshall. In 1380, the granted the lands of Petgervy to his son Galfrid.
- Barony of Aberdeenshire: ~1347, King David II himself granted to Donald de Strachan and his wife Annabel very extensive lands in Forfarshire, and a barony in Aberdeenshire.
- House of Knock: Thomas de Strachan got the lands of Knock in Kincardineshire.

It is highly unlikely this is a coincidence, as all these grants occurred almost simultaneously, particularly as they involved marriages, and marriages amongst the nobility were typically political. It follows that there must have been some new motivation that made marriage with the Strachans politically desirable.

It is believed by historians (see "Notes" immediately below) that the former Baron de Strachan was one of the large numbers of pro-Balliol nobles who, after the Battle of Inverurie (1308) fled to the English court, and where they were known as "the disinherited". But in 1347, King David, honouring obligations under the Franco-Scottish alliance, invaded the north of England, were heavily defeated, and captured by the English. So, from the perspective of "the disinherited", here was the son of the man (King Robert the Bruce) who had disinherited them arriving captive in London. If one king could disinherit them, why should not another? With a little persuasion King David reinstated the Strachans, among others.

== Clan Septs ==
The Anglicization of the Gaelic led to different spellings of the name, as transliterations were made in various censuses: Strachan (mainly Scots), Straghan (mainly Irish), or Strahan (both) and Strawn (American). Strachen, Strachn, Straughan, Strawhun, Straun, Strane, Stracon, Strahin, Strain, Strong, Strongman, Stronger, Strang, Stronge, Strang, Strange, Strangeman, Straughn, Strauchon, and Stranahan are also recognized derivations of Strachan.

== See also ==
- Armigerous clan
- Strachan Baronets
- Strachan (disambiguation)
