= Samuel Wilks =

British doctor (1824–1911)

Sir Samuel Wilks, Bt
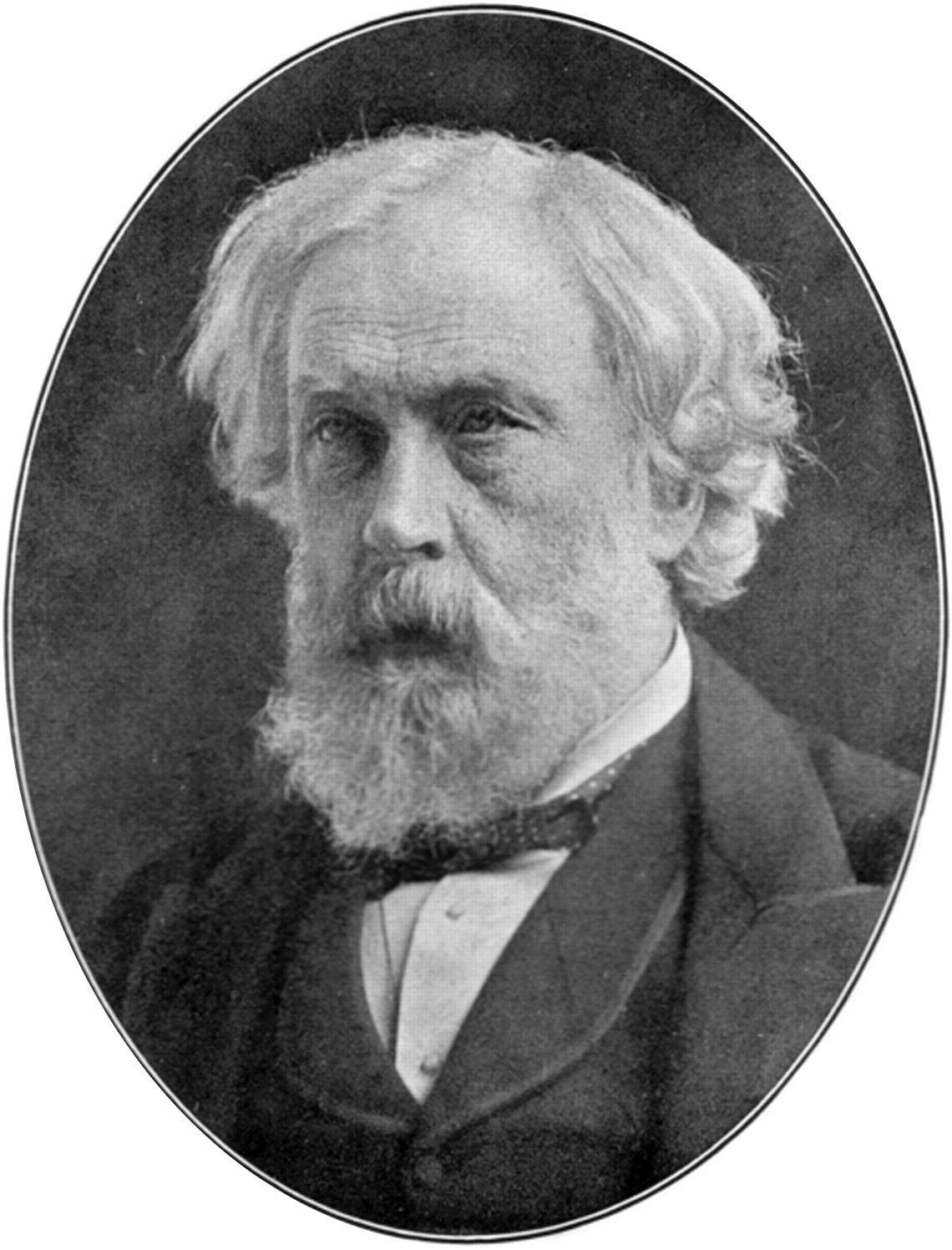
- Born: 2 June 1824
- Died: 8 November 1911 (aged 87)
- Education: Guy's Hospital
- Scientific career
- Fields: medicine

Sir Samuel Wilks, 1st Baronet, FRS, FRCP (2 June 1824 – 8 November 1911) was a British physician and biographer.

== Early life ==
Samuel Wilks was born on 2 June 1824 in Camberwell, London, the second son of Joseph Barber Wilks (1790–1854), a cashier at the East India House. After attending Aldenham School and University College School he was apprenticed to Richard Prior, a doctor in Newington.

Wilks's great-grandfather, another Samuel Wilks (1729–1803), was Examiner of India Correspondence at the East India Company between 1769 and 1785, the first to occupy that role. Through his father, Wilks was the nephew of Rev. Samuel Charles Wilks, the evangelical divine.

== Career ==
In 1842 he entered Guy's Hospital to study medicine. After graduating MB in 1848 he was hired as a physician to the Surrey Infirmary (1853). In 1856 he returned to Guy's Hospital, first as assistant physician and curator of its museum (a post he held for nine years), then as physician and lecturer on medicine (1857). From 1866 to 1870 he was examiner in the practice of medicine at the University of London and from 1868 to 1875 examiner in medicine at the Royal College of Surgeons.

== Achievements ==
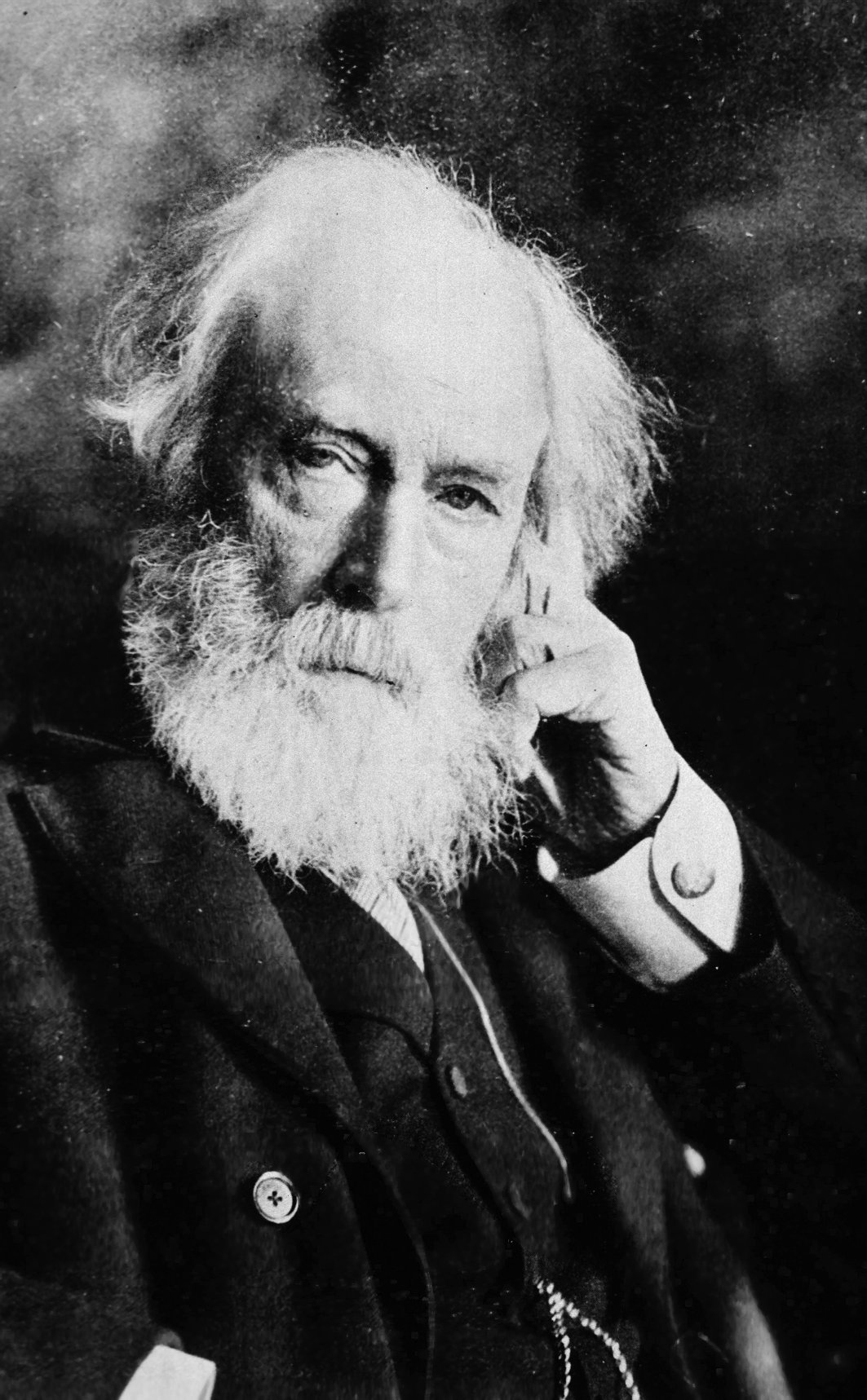

Among his major discoveries, Wilks recognised ulcerative colitis in 1859, differentiating it from bacterial dysentery. His work was confirmed later (1931) by Sir Arthur Hurst. Wilks's autopsy of a 42-year-old woman who died after several months of diarrhoea and fever demonstrated a transmural ulcerative inflammation of the colon and terminal ileum.

Wilks also firstly described trichorrhexis nodosa (the formation of nodes along the hair shaft), in 1852. The term was proposed in 1876 by Moritz Kaposi (1837–1902), a Hungarian dermatologist. In 1957, he provided the first autopsy description of a condition of the upper airways, later known as tracheobronchopathia osteochondroplastica. Subsequently, in 1868, he published the characteristic mental symptoms on alcoholic paraplegia (later to be named Korsakoff's syndrome). Wilks described the first case of myasthenia gravis, in 1877 (it was named "bulbar paralysis" in Guy's Hospital Reports 22:7).

He was a collaborator and biographer of the "Three Great", contemporary physicians who worked at Guy's Hospital, Dr. Thomas Addison, the discoverer of Addison's disease, Dr. Richard Bright, discoverer of Bright's disease and Dr. Thomas Hodgkin, discoverer of Hodgkin's lymphoma. After the death of Addison in 1860, he carried out the job of examining specimens from all over the country in order to confirm the diagnosis of Addison's disease and thus was able to amass a large case archive. He also rediscovered and confirmed the existence of Hodgkin's lymphoma, at the same time recognizing Hodgkin's priority and proposing the eponym.

== Honours and awards ==
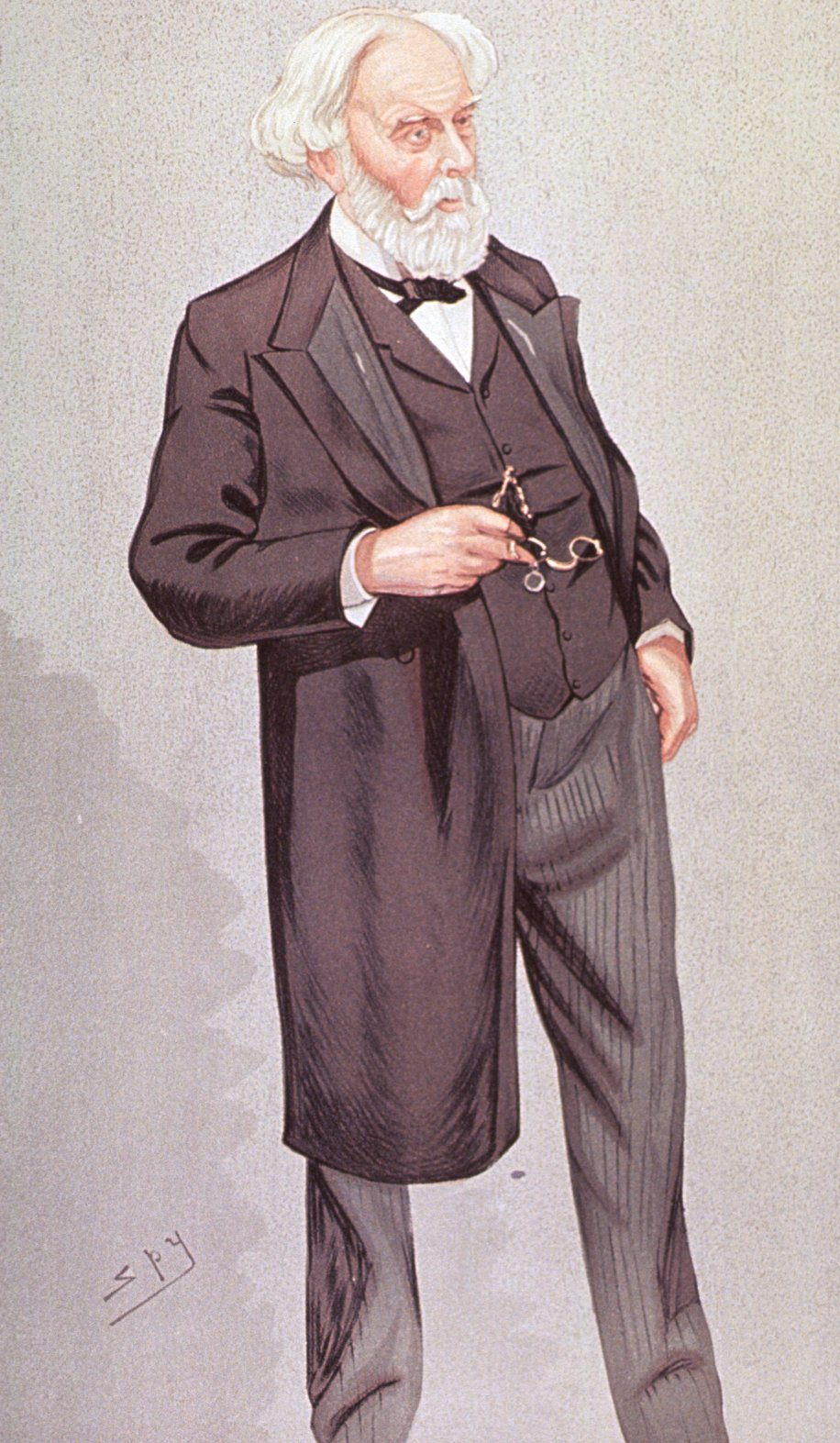
Samuel Wilks depicted by Spy in Vanity Fair, October 1892

Among his many services and honors, Wilks was elected a Fellow of the Royal Society in June 1870; was president of the Pathological Society (1881–1882); president of the Neurological Society (1887); member of the Senate of the University of London (1887–1900); member of the General Medicine Council (1887–1896) and president of the Royal College of Physicians (1896–1899). He was named Physician Extraordinary to Queen Victoria in 1897. The following year he was created a baronet, of Grosvenor Street in the Parish of Saint George Hanover Square in the County of London, on 5 February 1898.

Escutcheon of the Wilks baronets of Grosvenor Street

== Later life ==
In later life he suffered a stroke and was terminally paraplegic. He died aged 87 at his home in Hampstead on 8 November 1911. After his death the baronetcy became extinct. He had married Mrs. Elizabeth Anne Prior, widow of previous employer Richard Prior; they had no children.

== Publications ==
- Lectures on Pathological Anatomy, 1869
- Lectures on the Specific Fevers and on Diseases of the Chest, 1874
- Lectures on Diseases of the Nervous System, 1878
- Lectures on Pathology Delivered at the London Hospital. J & A Churchill, London, 1891.
- A Biographical History of Guy's Hospital, 1892 (with G. T. Bettany)
- The Relation of Man to the Animal World (1907)

Baronetage of the United Kingdom
New creation	Baronet (of Grosvenor Street); 1898–1911	Extinct
Preceded by Paget baronets	Wilks baronets of Grosvenor Street; 5 February 1898	Succeeded by Ellis-Nanney baronets
