= Rob Strachan =

Scottish clan chief (born 1960)

Charles Robert Lund (Rob) Strachan (born 5 June 1960), from the Mill of Strachan, Strachan in Aberdeenshire, is the appointed Commander of Clan Strachan. Rob is well travelled, having lived in six countries in the Middle East (Kuwait, Jordan, Yemen, Lebanon, Palestine, and Algeria) interspersed with 6 years in Canada as his father Maj. Benjamin Leckie Strachan, CMG, served as a British Ambassador and diplomat.

Strachan is the heir presumptive to the Mill of Strachan, a property of 50 acres in the District of Strachan. The property is agricultural; and is used for sheep farming, a riding school, a highland pony stud, and a fishery.

Clan Strachan held a Family Convention (or Ad Hoc Derbhfine) on 11 April 2014, in Edinburgh. This was a formal meeting supervised by Charles Burnett, Ross Herald Extraordinary, who had been appointed by the Lord Lyon King of Arms to preside. The meeting ended amicably with unanimous support for Rob Strachan to be recognized as Commander.

On 23 April 2014, Dr. Joseph J. Morrow, Lord Lyon King of Arms signed a warrant appointing Strachan as Commander of Clan Strachan. Strachan will serve as Commander for up to 10 years (perhaps less), "after which it is hoped he will be recognized by the Crown as hereditary Chief of Strachan".

== Biography ==
Strachan attended Loretto Nippers and Upper School, outside Edinburgh, Midlothian, Scotland, 1969–77. Attended South London College from 1980 to 1981; and Harper Adams University, an agricultural college in Shropshire, from 1982 to 1983.

In 1994 Strachan bought a derelict Mill on the Isle of Mull and restored it to a three bedroom house where he lived for 10 years with his partner and two of his four children. While on Mull, Strachan played rugby with the Mull Rugby Club.

Strachan has been self-employed in the construction and landscape industry for most of his life. He returned to The Mill of Strachan in 2008, where he built a home, restored the fish rearing ponds, the dams, and has been managing the rainbow trout fishery for the lochs at the Mill.

Strachan plays guitar, piano and bagpipes and is also a member of ‘The Banchory Singers’, a mixed voice, amateur choir, who recently won 'The Peterhead Shield' in a battle of choirs at the 2012 Aberdeen Music Festival. Strachan was also a semi-finalist in the Pop category for the 2010 UK Songwriting Contest. His entry, Nefertiti was a Queen, was played on BBC Radio 6 and BBC Radio Scotland.
