= John Pratt (archdeacon of Calcutta) =

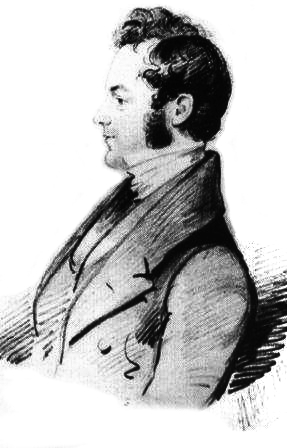
Sketch of John Henry Pratt in 1839

John Henry Pratt FRS (4 June 1809 – 28 December 1871) was a British clergyman, astronomer and mathematician. A Cambridge Apostle, he joined the British East India Company in 1838 as a chaplain and later became Archdeacon of Calcutta. Although nominated as Bishop of Calcutta, the decision was rescinded at the last moment with George Cotton being appointed to the position. A gifted mathematician who worked on problems of geodesy and earth science, he was approached by the Surveyor General of India to examine the errors in surveys resulting from the attraction of the plumb-line to the mass of the Himalayan mountains. This led him to develop a theory based on a fluid earth of crustal balance which became the basis for the isostasy principle. He died in India of cholera while on a visit to Ghazipur.

== Biography ==
Pratt was the second son of Josiah Pratt and Elizabeth née Jowett. His exact date of birth is debated and it is thought that he was born in London as he was baptised on 30 June 1809 at St Mary Woolnoth. His early schooling was at Oakham School under the tutelage of Dr Doncaster. He then went to Caius College, Cambridge and was a student of William Hopkins. He graduated B.A., third wrangler (after Alexander Ellice and Joseph Bowstead) in the Mathematical Tripos 1833, was elected to a fellowship, and proceeded M.A. in 1836. For a while he stayed at Cambridge and gave private tuitions. One of his students was Harvey Goodwin, later Bishop of Carlisle. While at Cambridge he wrote a book called Mathematical Principles of Mechanical Philosophy (1836, second edition 1845) which described mathematical applications in gravitational physics.

Pratt was appointed a chaplain of the East India Company through his father's influence on Bishop Daniel Wilson in 1838. He became Wilson's domestic chaplain, and in 1850 was appointed Archdeacon of Calcutta. The leisure allowed during his position in India allowed him to pursue mathematics although he noted that it was difficult to work alone and led to long exchanges in the journals of learned societies in Britain. When Bishop Wilson died in 1858, he was nominated for the position of Bishop. He was approved with the influence of Lord Shaftesbury on Lord Palmerston but it was shortly after decided in the wake of the 1857 uprising that no appointee known for missionary work should be appointed. The chosen appointee was instead Bishop Cotton. They held each other in high esteem. In 1864 an order was passed by the Secretary of State in India to retire chaplains after twenty-five years (earlier unlimited). An exception was made for Pratt and he was extended from October 1867 to March 1869 based on pleas from Bishop Cotton. When Pratt wished to resign in 1869, the Secretary of State extended his service to October 1872. After the death of Bishop Cotton in 1866, Pratt started a Hill Schools' Nomination Endowment Fund to help support Bishop Cotton's scheme of starting schools in the pleasant climate of the hills for the benefit of the children of poorer English residents in India who could not afford an education in England. Pratt married Hannah Maria Brown, daughter of George Francis Brown, a Bengal Civil Servant, at Bhagalpur on 6 March 1854. He was elected Fellow of the Royal Society in 1866. Pratt served as president of the Calcutta Society for Prevention of Cruelty to Animals founded by Colesworthey Grant in 1861. He died from cholera when he was on a visit to Ghazipur, India, on 28 December 1871. At the instigation of Bishop Robert Milman, a memorial to Pratt was erected in St. Paul's Cathedral, Calcutta.

== Works ==
Pratt was the author of Mathematical Principles of Mechanical Philosophy (1836), subsequently expanded and renamed On Attractions, Laplace's Functions and the Figure of the Earth (1860, 1861, and 1865). The final edition is a treatise of some 162 pages. The fundamental goal of the text is to supply an answer to the question as to whether the earth acquired its present form from originally being in a fluid state. The book is organised in two parts, the first takes Newton's law of universal gravitation as starting point, calculates the resulting force exerted at a point by a total mass in forms ranging from sphere to spheroid and subsequently to an irregular mass consisting of nearly spherical layers approximating more and more to the case of the earth. The second part is concerned with calculating the shape of the earth based first on the hypothesis of it being a fluid and then on geodetic principles. Part of his work was extensively used verbatim by Isaac Todhunter in his Treatise on Analytical Statics (1853).

Even as he travelled to India in 1838 aboard the Duke of Buccleuch he conducted experiments to examine currents in the ocean and measured temperatures at various depths. While in India, Pratt was approached by Andrew Scott Waugh, Surveyor General of India who had succeeded George Everest, to examine the gravitational anomaly caused by the Himalayas on the plumbline which resulted in errors in the Great Trigonometrical Survey. Pratt estimated the deviation of the plumbline that would be expected by the mass of the mountains (based on density estimated in 1772 at Mount Schiehallion in Scotland) but the observed deviations were much less. He propounded a theory that the density of the mountains was less than that of the underlying substrate. It was also noticed that the deviations of the plumbline were greater at the foot of the mountain and reduced as one moved away from the mountain. George Airy came up with the explanation that the roots of the mountain go deep into the earth. He compared it with a heap of logs in water and suggested that when a log juts higher above the water, a greater amount of it must be submerged. Pratt on the other hand suggested that there was a lower density under mountains below sea-level (actually refined later and termed the depth of compensation) and that this is offset by the mass above sea-level. Pratt's explanation assumes a variation in density whereas Airy assumes a constant crustal density. Pratt found fault with Airy's idea as it assumed a thinner crust (10 miles) than that estimated by William Hopkins (800 to 1000 miles) and also that the crust is lighter. Pratt said that the crust cools from the solid interior and should therefore be denser. Airy did not defend his view but Samuel Haughton used the debate to claim that mathematics was a useless tool for speculation. Pratt suggested that the crust would be depressed in the cooler parts of the world and suggested that the plumb deflection was caused by anomalous high density in the oceans south of the Himalayas. Pratt also applied his knowledge of physics and mathematics to a number of applications in India on which he was consulted by engineers. He examined arches, the physics involved in the sudden movement of a mass of water such as in the Indus floods of 1858 and in the bore of the Hooghly river, and computed the iron required for cantilever bridges.

Pratt took a great interest in Hindu Astronomy and supported the translation of the Siddhānta Shiromani, aiding its publication by the authors Lancelot Wilkinson and Pandit Bapu Deva Sastri in 1863. In response to a question from Professor Edward Byles Cowell on how H.T. Colebrooke came up with an age for the Vedas, he worked out calculations based on astronomical references, finding some errors in Colebrooke and came up with the suggestion that it could be from either around 1181 or 1229 BC. Pratt however felt that both Indian and Arab astronomy had failed to build a mathematical or physical framework and that their only major achievement was limited to the prediction of eclipses and even these, he considered as imprecise.

In 1849, Pratt and his brother wrote a memoir on their father. In 1856, Pratt published a book entitled Scripture and Science not at Variance, which went through numerous editions; it was first written to counter a statement by the mathematician Baden Powell (father of the scouting pioneer) that "all geology is contrary to Scripture", and then went on to counter other scientific theories including that of Evolution that were thought to conflict with the Bible. In 1865 he edited his father's manuscript Eclectic Notes, or Notes of Discussion on Religious Topics at the Meetings of the Eclectic Society, London, during the years 1798–1814. He also published a Paraphrase of the revelation of Saint John (1862).

A Pratt School for Girls was founded in his memory in Calcutta in 1876 by Bishop Milman. This school is located on A.J.C. Bose Road, Kolkata, and is now known as the Pratt Memorial School.
