= Alexander Crombie =

Scottish Presbyterian minister, schoolmaster and philosopher

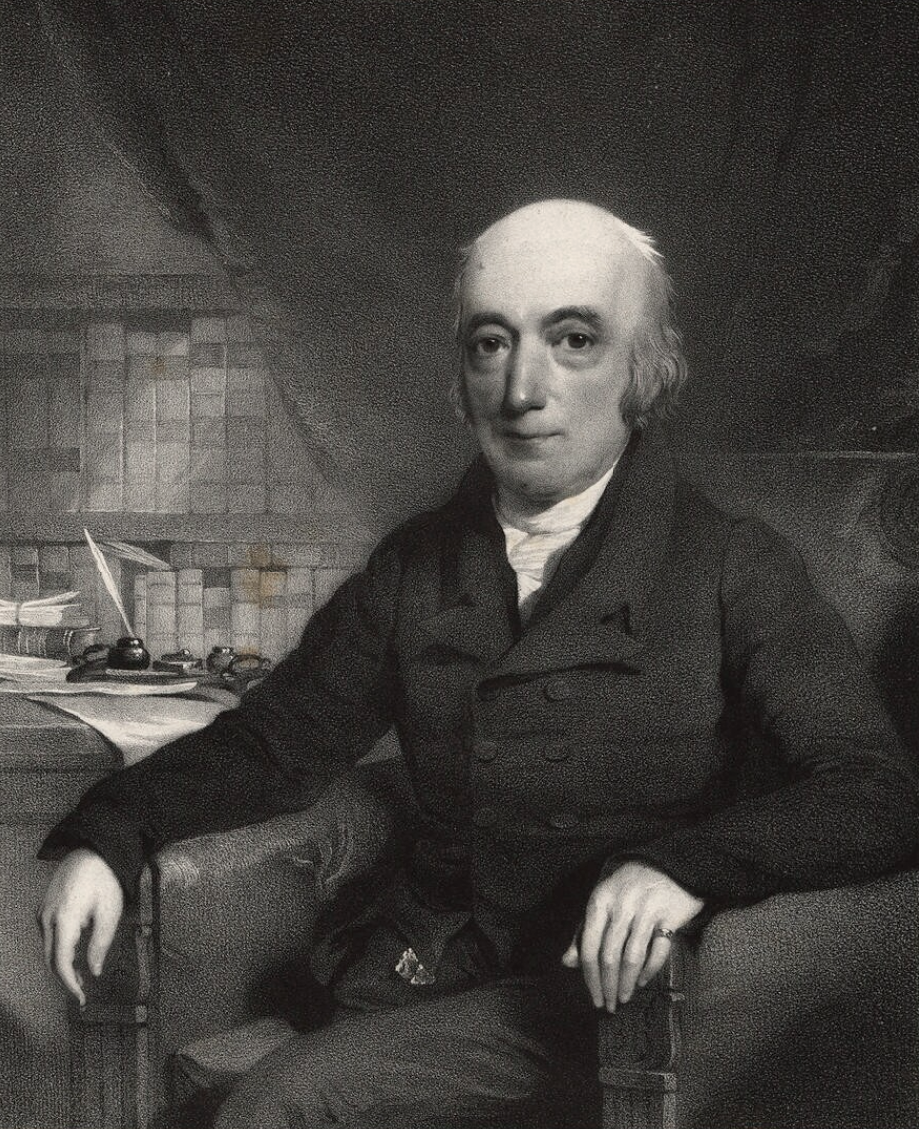
- Alexander Crombie, 1832 portrait
- Born: 17 July 1760; Aberdeen, Scotland
- Died: 11 June 1840 (aged 79); York Terrace, Regent's Park, London, England, UK
- Resting place: St Marylebone Parish Church
- Occupations: Presbyterian minister, schoolmaster and philosopher
- Spouses: unknown; Jane Nory (m. 1798)
- Children: 7

Alexander Crombie FRS (1760–1840) was a Scottish Presbyterian minister, schoolmaster and philosopher.

== Biography ==
He was born in Aberdeen on 17 July 1760, the son of Thomas Crombie. He studied at Marischal College. There he was taught divinity by James Beattie, gaining a M.A. in 1778. In 1794 his college awarded him an honorary doctorate (LL.D.).

Crombie was licensed to preach by the Presbytery of Aberdeen, but instead became a teacher. He moved by 1790 to London, where he ran an academy in Highgate, identified as a Unitarian school. Charles Jerram was an assistant there.

From 1796 to 1798, Crombie officiated at the Presbyterian Meeting House at Southwood Lane. The congregation had diminished in the time of Joseph Towers, who left in 1778. The meetings ceased in 1798.

Crombie then moved to be principal of a school in Greenwich, Kent. Among his pupils was William Wentworth.

Crombie died in York Terrace, Regent's Park, London, on 11 June 1840. He was buried at St Marylebone Church.

== Publications ==
=== Philosophy and theology ===
- A Defence of Philosophical Necessity (1793). This work defends determinism, and makes reference to David Hume.
- Letters from Dr. James Gregory...with Replies (1819)
- Natural Theology; or Essays on the Existence of the Deity, and of Providence, on the Immateriality of the Soul, and a Future State, 2 vols (1829)

In the preface to the Defence, Crombie states that personal freedom was discussed in his divinity course under Beattie, who followed Thomas Reid and the commonsense philosophy, and supported libertarian free will. He changed his view in the direction of necessitarianism after reading Joseph Priestley's Doctrine of Philosophical Necessity Illustrated (1777). He was spurred into print by reasoning from James Gregory's Philosophical and Literary Essays (1792), and his 1793 work draws heavily on Priestley's arguments. It adds to them, when he rebuts Reid's Essays on the Active Powers of the Human Mind (1788). There was a 1799 reply from John Golledge, addressed to Thomas Twining.

=== Educational ===
- The Etymology and Syntax of the English Language Explained and Illustrated, 2 vols. (1802). It drew on the works of James Harris, Robert Lowth, Priestley and Lindley Murray, and ran to nine editions (to 1865). Crombie was of his time in holding a narrow view of the possibilities of education in "correct" English. William Hazlitt sent William Godwin a copy of the work in 1809.
- Gymnasium sive, symbola critica, 2 vols (1812)
- A Few Cursory Observations, in Reply to the Strictures of the Reverend Mr. Gilchrist in his Rational Grammar on a Treatise on English Etymology and Syntax. (1817). Addressed to the General Baptist minister James Gilchrist (1783–1835).
- Clavis Gymnasii. Editioni tertiae accomodata, sive Exercitationes in symbolam criticam, partim, sicut in veteribus extant, datae, et partim a Rev. Alex. Crombie latine redditae. (1828)

=== Other ===
- Letters on the Present State of the Agricultural Interest Addressed to Charles Forbes, Esq. M.P. London (1816)
- A Letter to D. Ricardo, Esq. Containing an Analysis of his Pamphlet on the Depreciation of Bank Notes (1817)
- A Letter to Lieut. Col. Torrens, M.P. in answer to his Address to the Farmers of the United Kingdom (1832)
- The Strike, or, A Dialogue between Andrew Plowman and John Treadle. (1834)
- A Letter to Henry William Tancred, Esq, MP, on the Ballot (1837)
- A Letter to George Grote, Esq., M.P. on the Ballot (1838)
- Letters to W. E Gladstone (British Library Add 44356 ff 233, 237) (1839)

== Associations ==
An obituary of Crombie was written by John Grant A.M (c.1770–1846), "philologist and critic" of Crouch End, who had published a Latin grammar in 1808. It stated that in early life, Crombie was acquainted with Joseph Priestley, Richard Price and Alexander Geddes. Grant himself was a school principal in Hornsey, for 40 years from 1802; his 1813 English grammar praised Crombie's.

== Property ==
In Greenwich, Crombie lived in Maize Hill, a large mansion. It had been built by Sir Gregory Page, 2nd Baronet. Sir Walter James, 1st Baronet resided there, and Crombie bought it from him. It was demolished in 1822, and the site was occupied by Maize Hill Chapel, among other buildings. Crombie disposed of the site by dividing it into lots sold piecemeal. By that time, he was living in the Regent's Park area of London.

Crombie then in 1832 inherited a substantial property in Scotland from his cousin Alexander Crombie of Phesdo, Thornton Castle, Marykirk, Aberdeenshire. The hamlet of Phesdo was sold on after his death, around 1845, to Sir John Gladstone, 1st Baronet.

== Family ==
Crombie was married at least twice:

By his first marriage, he had a son:

1. Alexander Crombie (1784– ), called to the bar at Lincoln's Inn in 1822.

He remarried, on 6 March 1798, at Cluny, Aberdeenshire, to Jane Nory (c. 1773–1859); the couple had children including:

1. Lewis Crombie (1800–1880), a solicitor
2. Mary Crombie (born 1802)
3. Jane Crombie (1804–1846); married on 1 February 1823 at St George's, Hanover Square to Captain (later Rear-Admiral) Henry Algernon Eliot (son of Francis Perceval Eliot)
4. Thomas Crombie (born 31 December 1806), a major in the 60th Regiment of Foot
5. William Crombie (born 1808)
6. Peter Crombie (born 2 January 1809)
