= Paget baronets of Sutton Bonington (1897) =

Escutcheon of the Paget baronets of Sutton Bonington

The Paget baronetcy, of Sutton Bonington in the County of Nottingham, was created in the Baronetage of the United Kingdom on 25 September 1897 for Ernest Paget, Chairman of the Midland Railway from 1890 to 1911.

The 2nd Baronet was a locomotive engineer and railway administrator. The title became extinct on his death in 1936.

== Paget baronets, of Sutton Bonington (1897) ==
- Sir (George) Ernest Paget, 1st Baronet (1841–1923)
- Sir Cecil Walter Paget, 2nd Baronet (1874–1936)

== Notes ==
Baronetage of the United Kingdom
Preceded by MacCormac baronets	Paget baronets of Sutton Bonington; 25 September 1897	Succeeded by Wilks baronets
