= Thornton Castle, Marykirk =

Fortified structure in Aberdeenshire, Scotland

Coordinates: 56.83680°N 2.51372°W

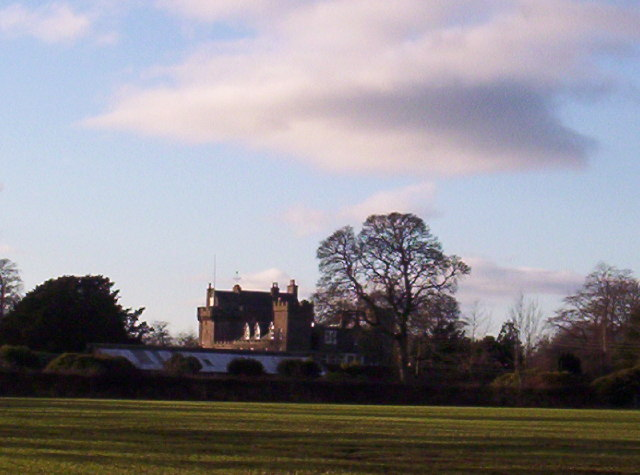
Thornton Castle, 2005 photograph

Thornton Castle, Marykirk, Aberdeenshire is a fortress or fortified residence in Marykirk, Aberdeenshire. Parts of the house date from 1531.

It was the traditional home of the Strachan family, but was held more recently by Rev Dr Alexander Crombie (1762–1840). Architecturally, it is a small square tower house, dated 1531, of three storeys.
