= St John's Chapel, Bedford Row =

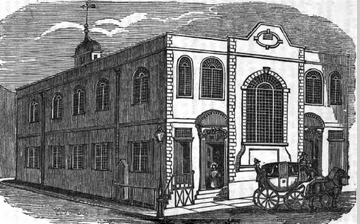
- St John's Chapel, Bedford Row
- Location: London
- Country: England
- Denomination: Anglican

History
- Dedicated: 1721; 305 years ago

Architecture
- Demolished: 1863; 163 years ago

St John's Chapel, Bedford Row, in Bloomsbury, London (opened 1721 - demolished 1863), was a proprietary chapel and the home of a large evangelical Anglican congregation in the 19th century. According to The Eclectic Review it was built for people who seceded from the congregation of St Andrew's, Holborn after Henry Sacheverell was forced on them by Queen Anne in 1713. It was located at the northwest corner of Millman Street and Chapel Street (now Rugby Street), Holborn, London, in the proximity of Bedford Row, and was opened in the year 1721.

When Rev Richard Cecil became minister there in March, 1780, it was described as being "the largest Church of England chapel in London. Having been much neglected, it required a large sum for its repair.

Daniel Wilson, later Bishop of Calcutta, became assistant curate there in 1808 and was the minister from 1812 to 1824. From 1824 to 1826 Charles Jerram was minister, before resigning to return to his incumbency as vicar of Chobham, Surrey. From 1827 to 1848, Baptist Wriotheseley Noel was the incumbent. He afterwards became a Baptist. In 1848–9 Thomas Dealtry, perhaps better known as Archdeacon of Calcutta and Bishop of Madras, was incumbent, as was Joseph Butterworth Owen later from 1854 to 1857.

According to Grayson Carter in Anglican Evangelicals after Noel's departure the chapel continued its evangelical ministry but not its prominence. The roof collapsed in November 1856, and the building was demolished in 1863. The church was associated with the Clapham Sect and the Eclectic Society, and with William Wilberforce and Zachary Macaulay.

In an earlier period John Worgan was organist (from 1760), and William Riley (fl. 1760–90), author of Parochial music corrected and The divine harmonist's assistant was singing master and clerk at this chapel.

In 1814 Miss Theophania Cecil produced The Psalm and Hymn Tunes used at St. John's Chapel, Bedford Row.

The organ built for the chapel in 1821 by Henry Lincoln was moved to Thaxted Parish Church in 1858. This organ was played at Thaxted by Gustav Holst at the time he composed The Planets. It was restored in 2014–15 by Goetze & Gwynn.
