= George Smith Drew =

English clergyman and writer

Vicar George Smith Drew

Orders
- Ordination: 1843

Personal details
- Born: 1819 Louth, Lincolnshire, United Kingdom
- Died: 21 January 1880 (aged 60–61) Holy Trinity vicarage, London

George Smith Drew (1819–1880) was an English clergyman and writer, Hulsean lecturer in 1877.

== Life ==
The son of George Drew, a tea dealer, of 11 Tottenham Court Road, London, he was born at Louth, Lincolnshire. Admitted a sizar of St John's College, Cambridge, on 22 January 1839, he took his Bachelor of Arts degree as 27th wrangler in 1843, and was ordained the same year. He took his Master of Arts degree in 1847. After serving a curacy at St Pancras, London, for about two years, he was presented to the incumbency of the Old Church, St Pancras, in 1845, and to that of St John the Evangelist, in the same parish, in 1850.

Drew was one of the earliest promoters of evening classes for young men, and published three lectures in support of the movement in 1851 and 1852. He became vicar of Pulloxhill, Bedfordshire, in 1854. He was then vicar of St Barnabas, South Kensington, from 1858 till 1870, was select preacher to the university of Cambridge in 1869–1970, and rector of Avington, Hampshire, during 1870–1873. He returned to London in 1873 as vicar of Holy Trinity, Lambeth, a preferment which he retained until his death.

Drew, who was a fellow of the Royal Geographical Society, and at one time an active member of the British Association, died suddenly at Holy Trinity vicarage, 21 January 1880.

== Works ==
During the winter and spring of 1856–1857 he made a tour in the East, and as the result he composed a book published as 'Scripture Lands in connection with their History,' London, 1860; 2nd edition, London, 1862, and again, London, 1871. In 1877 he was elected Hulsean lecturer at Cambridge, and the following year he published his discourses in a volume entitled 'The Human Life of Christ revealing the order of the Universe.... With an Appendix,' London, 1878.

His other writings are:

- 'Eight Sermons, with an Appendix,' London, 1845.
- 'The Distinctive Excellencies of the Book of Common Prayer. A Sermon [on Lamentations, iii. 41] preached in Old St Pancras Church; with a preface containing a brief history of that church,' London, 1849.
- 'Scripture Studies, or Expository Readings in the Old Testament,' London, 1855.
- 'Reasons of Faith, or the order of the Christian Argument developed and explained; with an Appendix,' London, 1862; 2nd edition, London, 1869.
- 'Bishop Colenso's Examination of the Pentateuch examined; with an Appendix,' London, 1863.
- 'Ecclesia Dei,' London, 1865.
- 'Church Life,' London, 1866.
- 'Korah and his Company; with other Bible teachings on subjects of the day, etc.,' London, 1868.
- 'Ritualism in some Recent Developments,' 8vo, London, 1868.
- 'Church Restoration: its Principles and Methods,' London, 1869.
- 'Divine Kingdom on Earth as it is in Heaven,' 8vo, London, 1871.
- 'Nazareth: its Life and Lessons,' 8vo, London, 1872.
- 'The Son of Man: his Life and Ministry,' London, 1875.
- 'Reasons of Unbelief; with an Appendix,' London, 1877.

He also wrote extensively in Patrick Fairbairn's Imperial Bible Dictionary, Cassell's Bible Dictionary, the Christian Observer, The Contemporary Review, and the Sunday Magazine.

== Family ==
He married, 20 May 1845, Mary, eldest daughter of William Peek of Norwood, Surrey.
