= Samuel Charles Wilks =

Samuel Charles Wilks (1789–1872) was an evangelical clergyman of the Church of England, known as a journalist.

== Life ==
He was son of Samuel Charles Wilks (1762–1819) of Newington, Surrey, a clerk at the East India Company, and Elizabeth Barber (1762–1830), daughter of Stephen Barber of Walsall, Staffordshire. Wilks's paternal grandfather, Samuel Wilks (1729–1803), was Examiner of India Correspondence at the East India Company between 1769 and 1785, the first to occupy that role. The Wilks family originally came from Great Bloxwich near Walsall. Wilks's great-grandfather, another Samuel Wilks (1698–1764), a locksmith and overseer of the poor for Great Bloxwich, was imprisoned in 1752 for refusing to comply with local tax regulations.

Wilks was educated for the church. He matriculated at St Edmund Hall, Oxford, on 8 June 1810, aged 21, and graduated B.A. in 1814 and M.A. in 1816.

Wilks took holy orders, being ordained deacon in 1813, and priest in 1814, by Richard Beadon. He was curate at Norton Malreward, Chew Stoke and Exeter St Martin. He attached himself to the Clapham sect, and in 1816 succeeded Zachary Macaulay as editor of the Christian Observer, the organ of the sect. Charles Simeon was a friend.

Wilks continued to edit the Christian Observer until 1850, when he was succeeded by John William Cunningham, and resided at the living of Nursling, near Southampton, to which he had been presented in 1847. He died there on 23 December 1872, in his eighty-fourth year, leaving several children.

== Works ==
While an undergraduate Wilks won in 1813 the premium of the Society for Promoting Christian Knowledge for an Essay on the Signs of Conversion and Unconversion in Ministers of the Church, which was published in 1814, and reached a third edition in 1830. In 1817 he dedicated to Hannah More two volumes of Christian Essays (London).

In 1835 Wilks published a new edition of Lord Teignmouth's Memoirs of Sir William Jones, with a life of Teignmouth. He was the author of tracts, essays, and letters on religious matters, mostly reprinted from the Christian Observer; he also supported, against prevalent religious opinion, many of the innovative views propounded by geologists.

== Family ==
Wilks married in 1818 Rebecca Emma Langstone Earle, daughter of Joseph Earle. Their children included the surgeon Alfred Garratt Platt Wilks. Their eldest son, Rev. Theodore Chambers Wilks (1828–1876), married in 1863 Agnes Maria Baker, daughter of Sir Henry Loraine Baker, 2nd Baronet. Agnes was the great-granddaughter of Mary Hayley (née Wilkes) and great-grandniece of the politician John Wilkes. While the Wilks family was very distantly related to the more famous Wilkeses – both had ancestral roots in Wolverhampton, Staffordshire – Theodore and Agnes's marriage was probably coincidental. Rev. Samuel Charles even sought to distance his family's name from that of the radical John Wilkes by claiming that his grandfather, Samuel Wilks the Examiner of India Correspondence, had deliberately cut the "e" from the surname "to prevent his being mistaken for Wilkes the republican". In reality, the surname was already spelt "Wilks" in the Bloxwich parish register decades earlier.

Rev. Samuel Charles Wilks's nephew, through his younger brother Joseph Barber Wilks (1790–1854), was Sir Samuel Wilks, 1st Baronet.
