= Sudbrook, Lincolnshire =

Hamlet in Lincolnshire, England

Coordinates: 52.991207°N 0.554246°W

Sudbrook
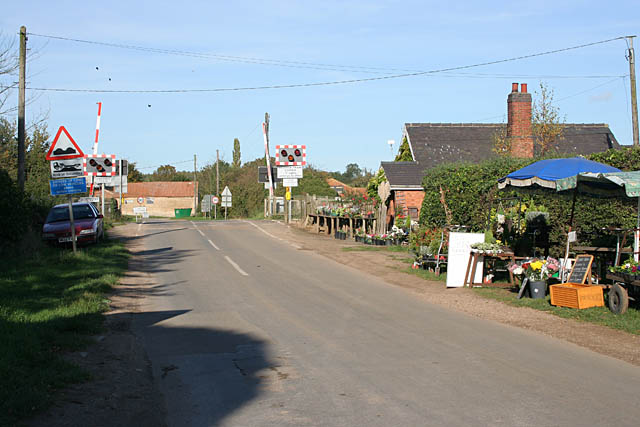
- Sudbrook level crossing

- Location within Lincolnshire
- OS grid reference: SK971447
  - London: 100 mi (160 km) S
- Civil parish: Ancaster
- District: South Kesteven
- Shire county: Lincolnshire
- Region: East Midlands
- Country: England
- Sovereign state: United Kingdom
- Post town: GRANTHAM
- Postcode district: NG32
- Police: Lincolnshire
- Fire: Lincolnshire
- Ambulance: East Midlands
- UK Parliament: Grantham and Bourne

Sudbrook is a hamlet in the South Kesteven district of Lincolnshire, England. It is situated 12 miles (19 km) south-east of Newark-on-Trent, 6 miles (10 km) north-east of Grantham and 1 mile (1.6 km) west of Ancaster. It forms part of Ancaster civil parish.
