= Henry Foster (clergyman) =

Evangelical clergyman

Rev. Henry Foster (c.1743–1814) was an evangelical clergyman who played a significant part in the religious revival of the late eighteenth century.

== Early life ==
Foster was born near Halifax and educated at The Queen's College, Oxford, an institution known for its supply of members from Northern England. Foster was ordained by the Bishop of London before turning 23 and served his entire ministerial career in London. There were few evangelical clergy in London during the late eighteenth century, and it was William Romaine, one of the few who was beneficed in his parish (from 1766), that took the young Foster on as his first assistant curate.

== Ministry ==
Romaine and Foster between them represented an extremely isolated, but strategically important, outpost of the then growing evangelical revival. The Revival was being furthered under the itinerant leadership of John Wesley and George Whitefield, both of whom had built private chapels in the metropolis (the Foundry in 1739 and the Tabernacle in 1756 respectively) - but neither of whom had close allies with a parish, until Romaine and Foster.

In addition to serving under Romaine, Foster preached regularly at St Antholin, Budge Row, St Swithin, London Stone, St Peter, Cornhill, Christ Church, Spitalfields, and St Margaret, Lothbury. In 1777, Foster was approached by Thomas Haweis to become the permanent minister of a key chapel in the Countess of Huntingdon's Connexion. Although Foster was willing, the scheme for a group of permanent chaplains did not progress. Foster was a founding member of the famous Eclectic Society, present at its first meeting on 16 January 1783. From 1785, Foster was minister of Long Acre Chapel in central London. It was in this role that he took on Richard Johnson as an assistant, who was to go on to serve as the first Christian minister in Australia.

The final two years of Foster's life were marred by crippling disability which forced him to resign the charge of Long Acre. His funeral sermon was preached at St James, Clerkenwell by Henry Watkins, minister of St Swithin's, where Foster had so frequently preached in the past.
