= Rauceby railway station =

Railway station in Lincolnshire, England

Rauceby
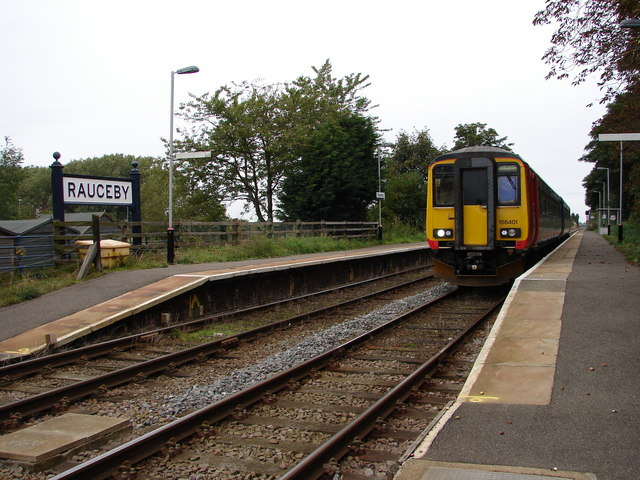

General information
- Location: South Rauceby, North Kesteven; England
- Coordinates: 52.985194°N 0.456265°W
- Grid reference: TF037442
- Manager: East Midlands Railway
- Platforms: 2

Other information
- Station code: RAU
- Classification: DfT category F2

Passengers
- 2021/22: ▲4,298
- 2022/23: ▲5,262
- 2023/24: ▲6,108
- 2024/25: ▼5,004
- 2025/26: ▼4,312
Location
Notes
- Passenger statistics from the Office of Rail and Road

Rauceby railway station is a railway station serving the villages of Quarrington and South Rauceby as well as the Greylees development in Lincolnshire, England.

== History ==
The station originally served Rauceby village and later, from 1902, Rauceby Mental Hospital (the former Kesteven Lunatic Asylum, which lies immediately to the south of the railway station and was closed in 1997) and the village of South Rauceby. The line was built by the Boston, Sleaford and Midland Counties Railway.

The former leader of the Liberal Democrats, Nick Clegg, proposed to his wife on a platform at the station.

== Station ==
The station is now owned by Network Rail and managed by East Midlands Railway, which provides all rail services.

A local road crosses the line at the western edge of the platforms, where a signal box and manually operated crossing gates are located. The main Grantham to Sleaford road runs to the north of the railway station and crosses the line about a quarter of a mile north-east of the station, where automatic barriers are used.

There is a working signal box at the west end of the station, however the station is unstaffed and offers limited facilities other than two shelters, bicycle storage, timetables and modern Help Points. The full range of tickets for travel are purchased from the guard on the train at no extra cost as there are no retail facilities or ticket machines at this station.

== Services ==
In the winter 2023 timetable, there are four daily services eastward to Skegness and three westward to Nottingham via Grantham, all at peak hours only. There is no Sunday service. A normal service operates on most bank holidays.

Preceding station	National Rail	Following station
Ancaster	East Midlands Railway Poacher Line Mondays-Saturdays only	Sleaford
