= Richard Cecil (priest) =

Richard Cecil (8 November 1748 – 15 August 1810) was a leading Evangelical Anglican priest of the 18th and 19th centuries.

== Life ==
Cecil was born in London. His father Thomas Cecil (died 1779) and grandfather were scarlet dyers to the British East India Company. His father was an Anglican while his mother Tabitha Grosvenor (died 1777) was a Dissenter, and the daughter of a dissenting affluent London merchant.

He entered The Queen's College, Oxford, in 1773, was ordained deacon in 1776 on the title of a priest named Pugh, of Rauceby, Lincolnshire, and was admitted to priest's orders in 1777.

Shortly thereafter he went to serve three Leicestershire churches: Thornton, Bagworth, and Markfield. His evangelical preaching produced many conversions and flourishing congregations here.

He later became minister of two small livings in Lewes, Sussex. After the death of his parents, he moved, because of bad health, to Islington, London and preached at different churches and chapels there.

In March 1780 he became minister of St John's Chapel, Bedford Row, which became a major Evangelical Anglican venue continuing into the mid 19th century. For some years he preached a lecture at Lothbury at 6 o'clock on a Sabbath morning, and later an evening lecture in Orange Street, followed by the chapel in Long Acre. From 1787 he preached the evening lecture at Christ Church, Spitalfields. He alternated with a Foster in these two last lectureships during the period 1784 to 1801, though he had help from a Pratt in the last few years there.

He became ill again in 1798, and later (1808–9) visited Bath, Clifton, and Tunbridge Wells for health reasons before relinquishing the lease of the chapel, moving in April 1810 to Hampstead, where he died four months later.

He was associated with the Clapham Sect whose best known member was William Wilberforce, and was a founding member and leader of the Eclectic Society, an evangelical Anglican society which was started along with John Newton and Henry Foster in the upstairs room of a pub in 1783, but later moved to the vestry at Bedford Row in 1784.
