= Ancaster railway station =

Railway station in Lincolnshire, England

Ancaster
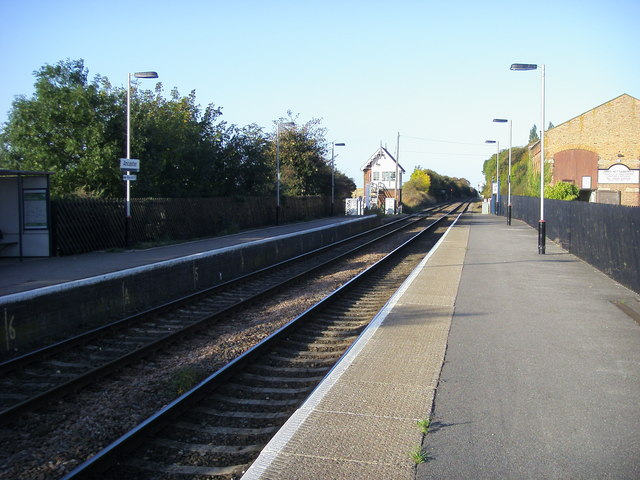

General information
- Location: Ancaster, South Kesteven; England
- Coordinates: 52.98772°N 0.53594°W
- Grid reference: SK983443
- Manager: East Midlands Railway
- Platforms: 2

Other information
- Station code: ANC
- Classification: DfT category F2

History
- Opened: 16 June 1857

Passengers
- 2021/22: ▲6,160
- 2022/23: ▲7,548
- 2023/24: ▼5,484
- 2024/25: ▲5,532
- 2025/26: ▲5,732
Location
Notes
- Passenger statistics from the Office of Rail and Road

Ancaster railway station serves the village of Ancaster, in Lincolnshire, England. The station lies 11.5 miles (19 km) north of Grantham on the Nottingham to Skegness Line.

The station is now owned by Network Rail and managed by East Midlands Railway, which provides all rail services.

There is a working signal box at the west end of the station, but the station itself is unstaffed and offers limited facilities other than two shelters, bicycle storage, timetables and modern help points. The full range of tickets for travel are purchased from the guard on the train, as there are no retail facilities or ticket machines at this station.

== History ==
Opened by the Boston, Sleaford and Midland Counties Railway, then run by the Great Northern Railway, it became part of the London and North Eastern Railway during the Grouping of 1923. The station then passed to the Eastern Region of British Railways on nationalisation in 1948.

When sectorisation was introduced in the 1980s, the station was served by Regional Railways until the privatisation of British Rail.

== Services ==
Monday through Saturday East Midlands Railway operates four services per day towards Nottingham, and five to Skegness. On Sundays there are two Nottingham services and an evening Skegness service. A normal service operates on most bank holidays.

Preceding station	National Rail	Following station
Grantham	East Midlands Railway Poacher Line	Rauceby
	Historical railways	
Honington	Great Northern Railway; Boston, Sleaford and Midland Counties Railway	Rauceby
