= Christian Observer =

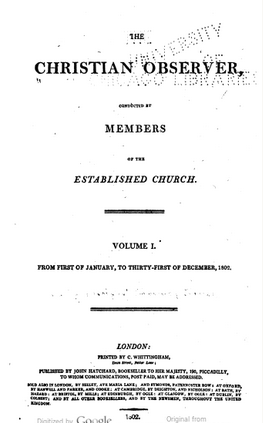
The Christian Observer (1802, v.1, London)

The Christian Observer was a London evangelical periodical, serving a readership in the Church of England. It appeared from 1802 to 1874.

== History ==
The Christian Observer was founded by William Hey "in response to the dissenters' Leeds Mercury." It was published by the bookseller John Hatchard. Various members of the Clapham Sect were associated with the paper from the outset. Josiah Pratt, who had called for such an evangelical periodical in a 1799 meeting of the Eclectic Society, served as editor for the first number in January 1802. Pratt was succeeded after six weeks by Zachary Macaulay, who edited the periodical until 1816.

Later editors were Samuel Charles Wilks (from 1816 to 1849), William Goode (from 1847 to 1849), John William Cunningham (from 1850 to 1858), and John Buxton Marsden (from 1859 to 1869).

Contributors included Thomas Babington, the clergyman and theological writer Charles Smith Bird (1795–1862), the lay theological writer John Bowdler (1783–1815), the writer on prophecy William Cuninghame of Lainshaw (c. 1775-1849), the clergyman William Dealtry (1775–1847), the clergyman and biblical scholar George Smith Drew (1819–1880), John Shore, 1st Baron Teignmouth, Henry Thornton, Henry Tuke, John Venn (1759–1813), and Daniel Wilson.
