= South Rauceby =

Village and civil parish in the North Kesteven district of Lincolnshire, England

Coordinates: 52.996833°N 0.474171°W

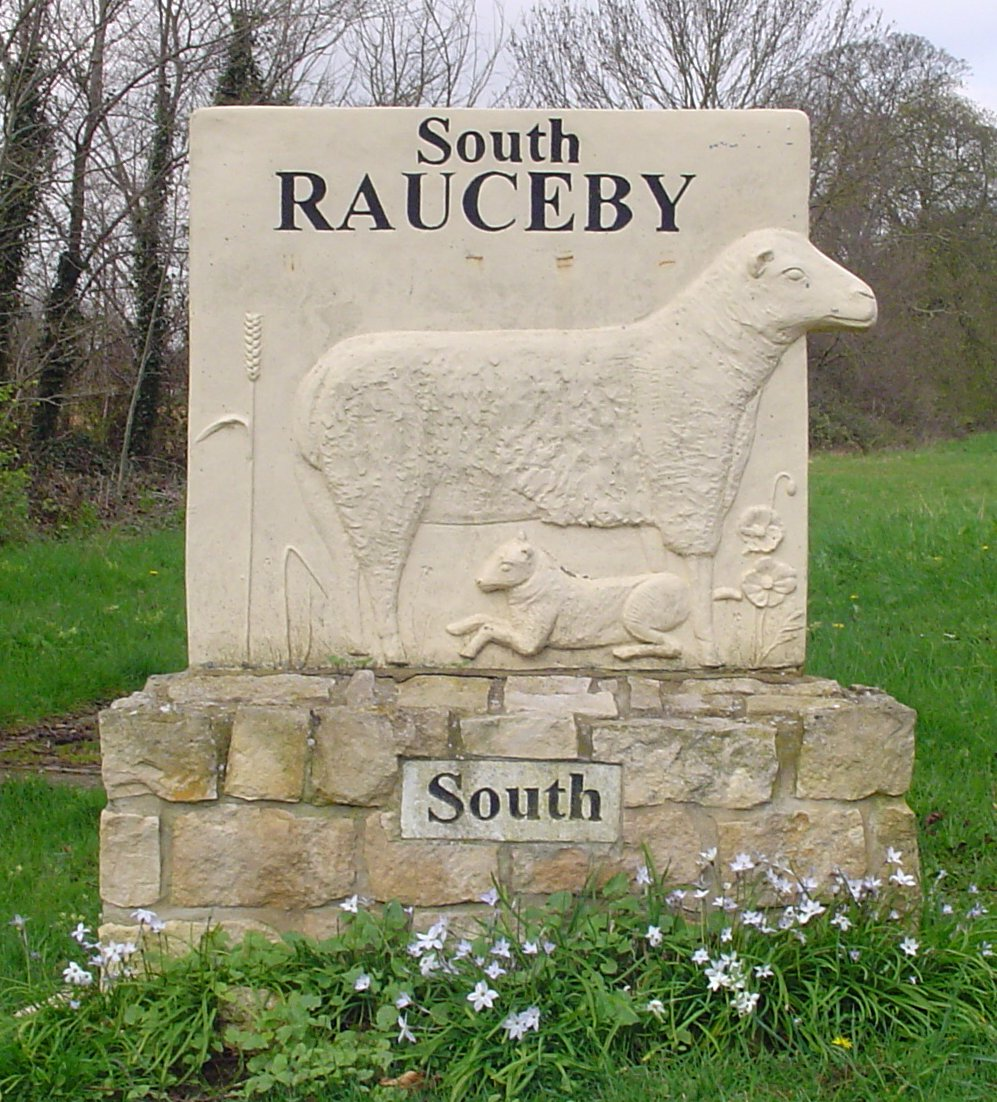
- Village sign

- Location within Lincolnshire
- Population: 367 (2011)
- OS grid reference: TF025455
  - London: 105 mi (169 km) S
- District: North Kesteven
- Shire county: Lincolnshire
- Region: East Midlands
- Country: England
- Sovereign state: United Kingdom
- Post town: SLEAFORD
- Postcode district: NG34
- Dialling code: 01529
- Police: Lincolnshire
- Fire: Lincolnshire
- Ambulance: East Midlands
- UK Parliament: Sleaford and North Hykeham

South Rauceby is a village and civil parish in the North Kesteven district of Lincolnshire, England. It is situated 2.5 miles (4.0 km) west from Sleaford. The village of North Rauceby is less than 1 mile (1.6 km) to the north. The 2001 Census recorded a village population of 330 in 161 household, increasing to 367 at the 2011 census.

Rauceby village hall is situated on Main Street and serves both North and South Rauceby. It provides for village clubs and events, and the Rauceby Pre-School which serves the local community and surrounding area. The village's public house is the Bustard Inn, a Grade II listed building. Other listed buildings, also designated Grade II, include a windmill, now a house, built c. 1840, and South Rauceby Hall.

A daily bus service on the Grantham to Sleaford route is provided by Centrebus. Rauceby railway station, adjoining the A153 road, is less than 1 mile to the south-east.
