= Ancaster stone =

Middle Jurassic oolitic limestone

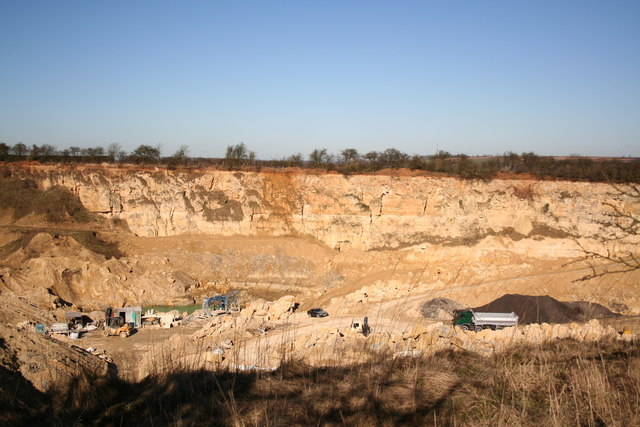
One of the Ancaster stone quarries

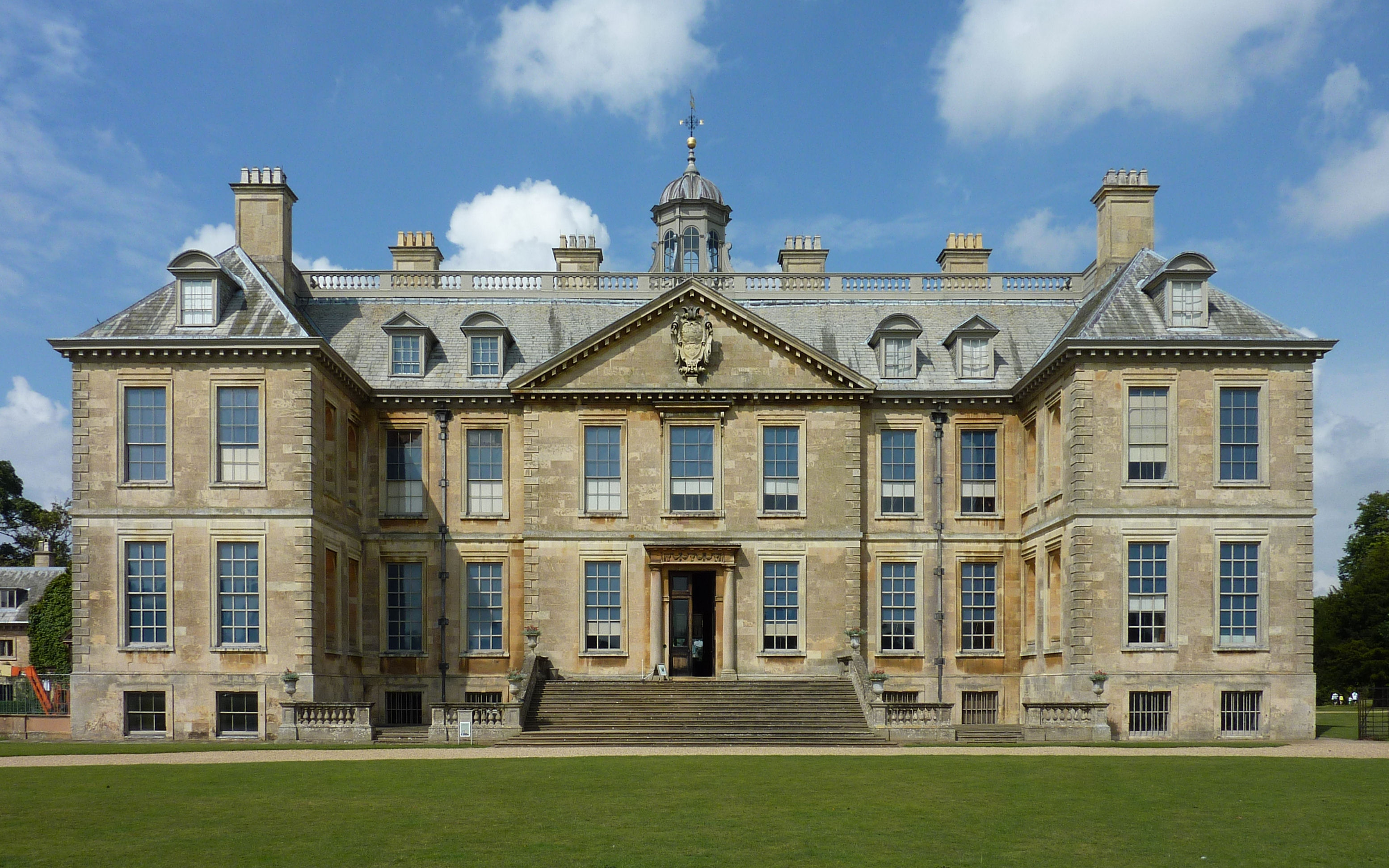
South (front) facade of Belton House

Ancaster stone is Middle Jurassic oolitic limestone, quarried around Ancaster, Lincolnshire, England. There are three forms of this limestone: weatherbed, hard white and freestone. Ancaster stone is a generic term for these forms of limestone found only at Ancaster, Glebe quarry (UK Grid reference: SK992409) being the only active quarry where Ancaster Hard White and Ancaster Weatherbed are quarried.

As well as being used for the church at Ancaster and a number of village buildings, there have also been many great works of architecture constructed from Ancaster stone, including Wollaton Hall, Belton House, Harlaxton Manor, Mentmore Towers, St Pancras Station, Norwich Cathedral and St John's College, Cambridge. Ancaster stone may be seen in a modern building, in use as a facing and flooring stone, at The Collection in Lincoln, Lincolnshire. Stapleford Park is a more traditional building constructed from it. Under certain lighting conditions the stone in its unpolished state can exhibit a greenish-blue hue.

It has been used for sculptures by Barbara Hepworth and Henry Moore.

== See also ==
- Lincolnshire Limestone Formation
- Jerusalem stone
- Sydney sandstone
