= Ancaster, Lincolnshire =

Village in Lincolnshire, England

Coordinates: 52.97°N 00.54°W

Ancaster
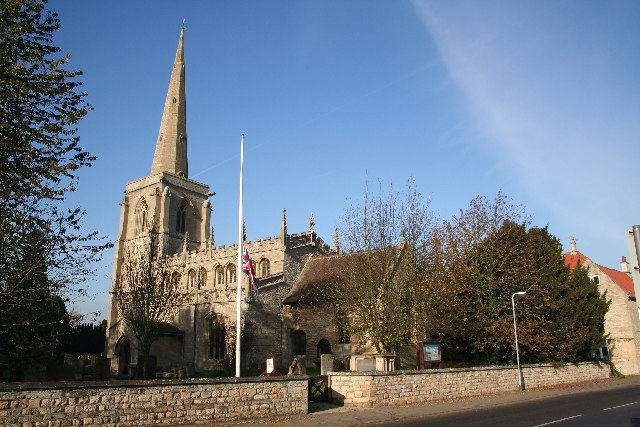
- St Martin's Church, Ancaster

- Location within Lincolnshire
- Population: 1,317 (2001)
- OS grid reference: SK983438
  - London: 100 mi (160 km) S
- District: South Kesteven
- Shire county: Lincolnshire
- Region: East Midlands
- Country: England
- Sovereign state: United Kingdom
- Post town: Grantham
- Postcode district: NG32
- Dialling code: 01400
- Police: Lincolnshire
- Fire: Lincolnshire
- Ambulance: East Midlands
- UK Parliament: Sleaford and North Hykeham

Ancaster is a village and civil parish in the South Kesteven district of Lincolnshire, England, on the site of a Roman town. The population of the civil parish was 1,317 at the 2001 census, increasing to 1,647 at the 2011 census. The civil parish includes the settlements of Sudbrook and West Willoughby.

The village is related to the titles of Duke of Ancaster and Kesteven and Earl of Ancaster, both of which are now extinct.

== History ==
Ancaster was a Roman town at the junction of the Roman roads of Ermine Street and King Street.

During the Romano-British period, the Romans built a roadside settlement on the site of a "Corieltauvi" settlement. It was traditionally thought to have been named "Causennis," although that is now believed to be Saltersford near Grantham. Ancaster lies on Ermine Street, the major Roman road heading north from London. To the north-west of Ancaster is a Roman marching camp, and some 4th-century Roman earthworks are still visible. Excavations have found a cemetery containing more than 250 Roman burials, including 11 stone sarcophagi. In the later years of Roman occupation, a large stone wall with accompanying ditches was erected around the town, possibly for defence against marauding Saxons.

The place name Ancaster is first attested in a 12th-century Danelaw charter from the reign of Henry II, and in a legal document of 1196, where it appears as Anecastre. The name means "the Roman fort of 'Anna'."

An excavation by the television programme Time Team in 2001 revealed a cist burial bearing an inscription to the god Viridius. The dig also uncovered Iron Age to 3rd-century pottery, a 1st-century brooch, and some of the Roman town wall.

Ancaster Hall at the University of Nottingham was named after the parish, as was the extinct title of the Earl of Ancaster.

In 2005, the once widespread but now rare tall thrift plant was discovered in Ancaster churchyard, one of only two places in the country where the plant has been found to occur. A preservation regime for the plant was instituted by English Nature.

The town of Ancaster in Ontario, Canada, was established in Upper Canada in 1792 and was named after Ancaster, Lincolnshire, by British army officer and the first Lieutenant Governor of Upper Canada John Simcoe, apparently inspired to do so by Peregrine Bertie, the 3rd Duke of Ancaster and Kesteven.

== Geography ==
The River Trent formerly flowed east from the Nottingham area towards the North Sea, via the Vale of Belvoir and the Ancaster Gap in the limestone ridge to the north known as the Lincoln Cliff.

Ancaster lies midway between Sleaford and Grantham on the A153 road, at its junction with the B6403 (Ermine Street). North of the village, the B6403 (High Dike) is the dividing line between South and North Kesteven. Towards Sleaford lies Wilsford and to the west Sudbrook.

The civil parish boundaries are different: the civil parish also covers the settlements of Sudbrook and West Willoughby.

== Amenities ==
Ancaster has a Church of England primary school, a butcher and grocery shop, a small railway station on the Nottingham–Skegness line, and a post office and petrol station. Of two public houses in Ermine Street, only the Railway Inn remains. A sports and social club is associated with the playing field, which hosts Ancaster Cricket Club. West of the village on Willoughby Moor is a holiday park. There are also two nearby nature reserves, each a Site of Special Scientific Interest, where the tall thrift plant is found.

== Church ==
The village's Grade I listed Anglican parish church is dedicated to St Martin, one of many churches on Roman sites which are dedicated to the Roman soldier who converted to Christianity and later became Bishop of Tours and a saint. St Martin's stands slightly elevated on the Roman road Ermine Street, on the probable site of a Roman temple. It is first documented in 1200 when the body of Bishop Hugh was rested overnight at the church while on its way to Lincoln. The church has decorated Norman arches and an Early English font. The corbels are decorated with medieval figurative imagery: a drinking nun, an older woman, and a farmer with a medieval headdress. There is also a Green Man "mouth-puller" in the vestry and the remains of a Sheela na gig on the north side of the tower. There are also figures carved on the wooden ceiling. Two Roman relief sculptures were found on the East Wall of the church in the 1960s.

The ecclesiastical parish links to Wilsford as part of the Loveden Deanery of the Diocese of Lincoln.

== See also ==
- Ancaster stone
