= North Rauceby =

Village and civil parish in the North Kesteven district of Lincolnshire, England

Coordinates: 53.006352°N 0.478784°W

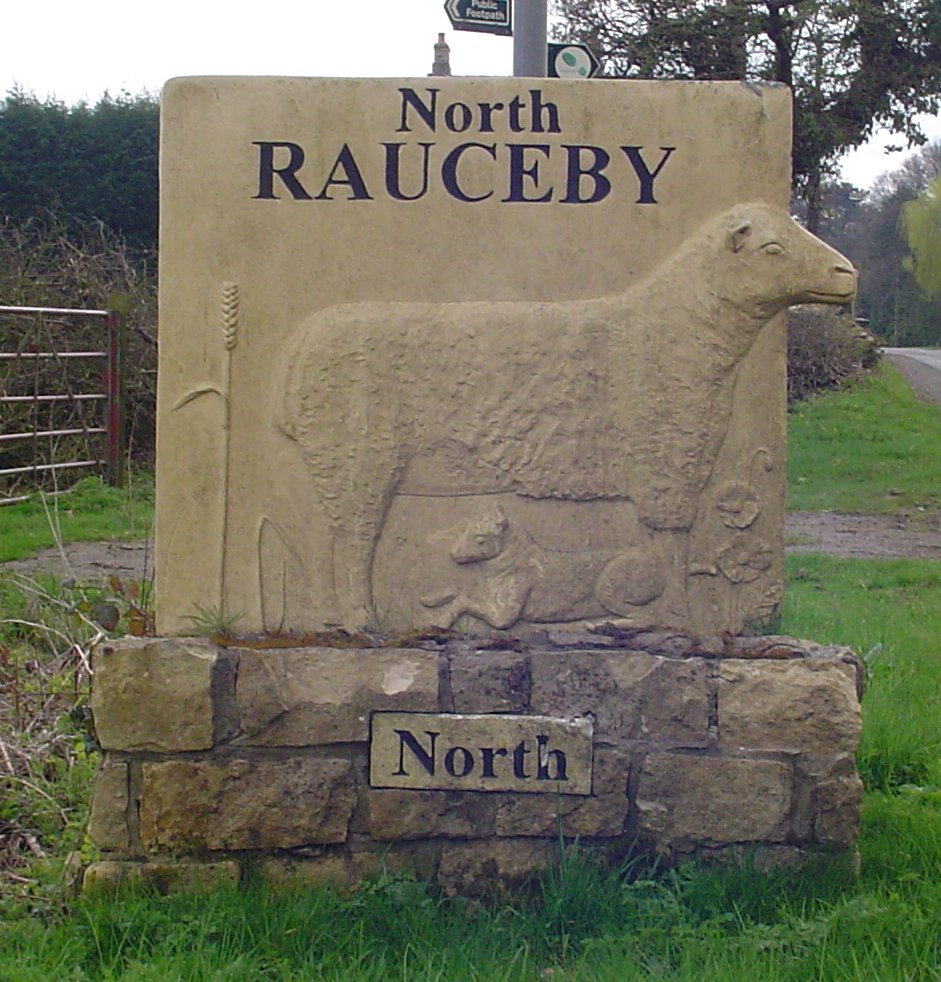
- North Rauceby village sign

- Location within Lincolnshire
- Population: 159 (2011)
- OS grid reference: TF024464
  - London: 105 mi (169 km) S
- District: North Kesteven
- Shire county: Lincolnshire
- Region: East Midlands
- Country: England
- Sovereign state: United Kingdom
- Post town: SLEAFORD
- Postcode district: NG34
- Dialling code: 01529
- Police: Lincolnshire
- Fire: Lincolnshire
- Ambulance: East Midlands
- UK Parliament: Sleaford and North Hykeham

North Rauceby is a village and civil parish in the North Kesteven district of Lincolnshire, England. It is situated 4 miles (6 km) north-west from Sleaford, and at the 2011 census had 159 residents.

North Rauceby is a shrunken village, being associated with a partial lost settlement.

The Church of England parish church is dedicated to St Peter, and is situated on Church Lane; it serves both North and South Rauceby and is in the group of churches that includes those of surrounding villages. The church has a spire that reaches 107 feet (33 metres) high. The village school is Rauceby Primary School, which also serves South Rauceby and other local villages.

North Rauceby is home to Cranwell Aviation Heritage Centre; its site also houses a park for touring caravans. The Rauceby Maize Maze is an attraction during the summer months.

There is no bus service for North Rauceby, except for school children during term time.

== Rauceby Hoard ==
A hoard of early 4th-century Roman coins is believed to be the largest of its type ever discovered in Britain.

More than 3,000 copper-alloy coins were found by two metal detectorists ( Rob Jones and Craig Paul) near the village of Rauceby, Lincolnshire, in July 2017.

Archaeologists say the coins were possibly buried as part of a ceremony, or commemoration.
