= Eclectic Society (Christian) =

18th-century English Christian group

The Eclectic Society was founded in 1783 by a number of Anglican clergymen and laymen as a discussion group, and was instrumental in the founding of the Church Missionary Society in 1799.

== Origins ==
The society's early members included clergyman and poet John Newton (1725–1807), Rector of Clapham and founder of Church Missionary Society John Venn (1759–1813), Thomas Scott the Commentator, Richard Cecil, and Henry Foster. The Eclectic Society met fortnightly, initially at the Castle and Falcon Inn, and later in the vestry of St John's Chapel, Bedford Road, London. At the outset in 1783, two of the founding clerics were relatively new in their Metropolitan incumbencies; Newton was four years established at St Mary Woolnoth (having moved from Olney), while Foster had held Long Acre for three years (having served as a lecturer in London since 1766). Cecil held parishes in Sussex, but resided in Islington. The society grew in influence as its membership both expanded and matured.

== Foreign missions ==
Foreign missions were first discussed in 1786, and again in 1789 and 1791 with the growing realization of the scope for a society that would evangelise indigenous peoples around the world. Foreign missions was again discussed in 1796, by which time both the Baptist and London Missionary Societies had been founded, but it was not until three years later that action was taken.

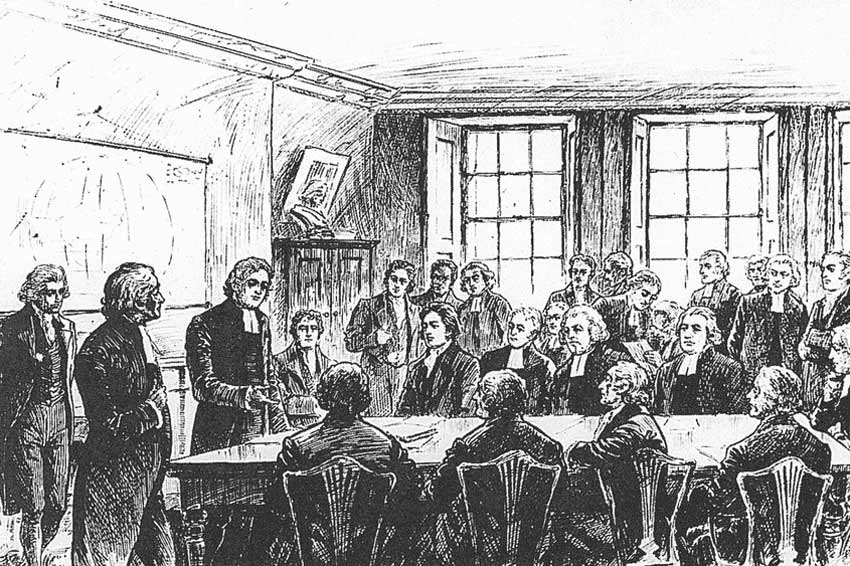
Founding meeting of the Church Missionary Society at Aldersgate Street in the City of London on 12 April 1799

In 1797, Josiah Pratt, a clergyman from Birmingham who came to London as a curate, joined the Eclectic Society and in February 1799 he proposed the following question for discussion: "How far may a periodical Publication be made subservient to the interest of Religion?" The discussions led, two years later, to the starting of the Christian Observer which became for much of the nineteenth century a valuable organ of Evangelical principles and work. The following month, the subject for discussion was "What methods can we use more effectually to promote the knowledge of the Gospel among the Heathen?" and it was ultimately resolved at this meeting to form a society. At a public meeting in April, the Church Missionary Society for Africa and the East was formed.
