= Outline of the Renaissance =

Overview of and topical guide to the Renaissance

The following outline is provided as an overview of and topical guide to the Renaissance:

Renaissance – cultural movement that spanned roughly the 14th to the 17th century, beginning in Italy in the Late Middle Ages and later spreading to the rest of Europe. The term is also used more loosely to refer to the historical era, but since the changes of the Renaissance were not uniform across Europe, this is a general use of the term.

== Essence of the Renaissance ==
Renaissance

- Cultural movement
- Time period, age, or era

== History of the Renaissance period ==
- Early modern Europe
- High Renaissance

=== Renaissance developments by field ===
- Confectionery in the English Renaissance
- Gunpowder warfare
- Renaissance philosophy
  - Platonism in the Renaissance
  - List of Renaissance commentators on Aristotle
  - Renaissance humanism
    - Renaissance humanism in Northern Europe
- History of science in the Renaissance
  - Medical Renaissance
- Renaissance technology

==== Renaissance art ====
Renaissance art

- High Renaissance
- Renaissance architecture
  - Brick Renaissance
  - List of Renaissance structures
  - List of English Renaissance theatres
  - Italian Renaissance architecture
    - Libraries in the Medieval and Renaissance Periods
    - Italian Renaissance domes
    - Italian Renaissance interior design
  - Renaissance architecture in Central and Eastern Europe
  - English Renaissance architecture
    - Elizabethan architecture (Early English Renaissance architecture)
    - List of English Renaissance theatres
  - French Renaissance architecture
    - Châteaux of the Loire Valley
    - Renaissance architecture of Toulouse
  - German Renaissance architecture
    - Saxon Renaissance
    - Weser Renaissance
  - Italian Renaissance architecture
    - Venetian Renaissance architecture
  - Mosan Renaissance architecture
  - Polish Cathedral style
  - Spanish Renaissance architecture
- Renaissance dance
- Renaissance gardening
  - Italian Renaissance garden
  - Gardens of the French Renaissance
- Renaissance literature
  - Libraries in the Medieval and Renaissance Periods
  - Dutch Renaissance and Golden Age literature (Netherlands)
  - English Renaissance literature
  - French Renaissance literature
  - German Renaissance literature
  - Greek scholars in the Renaissance
  - Italian Renaissance literature
  - Spanish Renaissance literature
  - Swedish reformation and Renaissance literature
- Renaissance music
  - English Renaissance music
  - French Renaissance music
  - Transition from Renaissance to Baroque in instrumental music
- Renaissance painting
  - Dutch and Flemish Renaissance painting (Netherlands)
    - Early Netherlandish painting
  - Italian Renaissance painting
    - Themes in Italian Renaissance painting
  - Oriental carpets in Renaissance painting
- Sculpture in the Renaissance period
- Renaissance theatre
  - English Renaissance theatre

=== The Renaissance by region ===
- Italian Renaissance (1401–1600)
  - Italian Renaissance architecture
    - Italian Renaissance interior design
    - Venetian Renaissance architecture
  - Italian Renaissance gardening
  - Italian Renaissance literature
  - Italian Renaissance painting
    - Italian Renaissance painting, development of themes
  - Italian Renaissance sculpture
  - Roman Renaissance
  - Sicilian Renaissance
  - Venetian Renaissance
    - Venetian Renaissance architecture
- Armenian Renaissance
- Croatian Renaissance
- Czech Renaissance
  - Czech Renaissance architecture
- Greek Renaissance
- Northern Renaissance
  - English Renaissance (1485–1629)
    - Confectionery in the English Renaissance
    - Elizabethan architecture (Early English Renaissance architecture)
    - English Renaissance literature
    - English Renaissance music
      - List of English Renaissance composers
    - English Renaissance theatre
      - List of English Renaissance theatres
  - French Renaissance (1494–1610)
    - French Renaissance architecture
      - Châteaux of the Loire Valley
      - Lyon during the Renaissance
      - Renaissance architecture of Toulouse
    - French Renaissance literature
    - French Renaissance music
    - Gardens of the French Renaissance
  - German Renaissance
    - Weser Renaissance
    - German Renaissance literature
  - Renaissance in the Low Countries
    - Renaissance in the Netherlands
      - Dutch Renaissance and Golden Age literature
      - Dutch and Flemish Renaissance painting
        - Early Netherlandish painting
        - Flemish painting
  - Renaissance in Poland (1500–1650)
    - Polish Cathedral style
    - Lublin Renaissance
  - Renaissance in Scotland
- Portuguese Renaissance (14th & 15th centuries)
  - Renaissance architecture in Portugal
- Spanish Renaissance (1550–1587)
  - Spanish Renaissance architecture
  - Spanish Renaissance literature

=== Renaissance Historiography ===
- Historiography of 12th century Renaissance

=== Other periods of cultural rebirth ===
- Medieval renaissances
  - Carolingian Renaissance (8th and 9th centuries)
  - Ottonian Renaissance (10th century)
    - Palaeologan Renaissance
  - Renaissance of the 12th century
- African Renaissance
  - Ethiopian Renaissance
- American Renaissance
  - American Renaissance (literature)
  - Black Renaissance in D.C.
  - Charleston Renaissance
  - Chicago Black Renaissance
  - Harlem Renaissance
    - Theater companies of the Harlem Renaissance
    - List of figures from the Harlem Renaissance
      - List of female entertainers of the Harlem Renaissance
  - Hawaiian Renaissance
  - Native American Renaissance
  - San Francisco Renaissance
  - Southern Renaissance (United States)
- Bengal Renaissance
- Byzantine Renaissance
- Chinese Cultural Renaissance
- Creole Renaissance
- Dinosaur renaissance
- European Urban Renaissance
- Macedonian Renaissance
- Māori renaissance
- Mexican Renaissance
- Neo-Renaissance
- Nepal Bhasa renaissance
- Renaissance Revival architecture
- Russian Religious Renaissance
- Scottish Renaissance
- Scottish Renaissance painted ceilings
- Executed Renaissance
- Renaissance of Sumer
- Tamil Renaissance
- Timurid Renaissance
- Urban renaissance (UK)
- Yiddish Renaissance

== General Renaissance-related concepts ==
- Allegory in Renaissance literature
- Canons of Renaissance poetry
- Polymath
- Renaissance Latin
- Renaissance magic
- Renaissance man
- Renaissance magic
- Renaissance Papacy
- Renaissance reenactment
- Renaissance studies

== Publications dedicated to the study of the Renaissance ==
- Brain Renaissance
- Census of Antique Works of Art and Architecture Known in the Renaissance
- International Bibliography of Humanism and the Renaissance
- Leonardo da Vinci: The Mind of the Renaissance
- The Civilization of the Renaissance in Italy

=== Periodicals on the Renaissance ===
- English Literary Renaissance
- Mediaeval and Renaissance Studies (defunct)
- Renaissance Magazine
- Renaissance and Reformation
- Studies in Medieval and Renaissance Teaching

== Organizations dedicated to the study or re-enactment of the Renaissance ==
- Arizona Center for Medieval and Renaissance Studies
- Association for Renaissance Martial Arts
- Centre for Medieval and Renaissance Studies
- Centre for Renaissance and Early Modern Studies
- Renaissance Society of America
- Society for Medieval and Renaissance Philosophy
- Society for Renaissance Studies

=== Renaissance fairs ===
Renaissance fair

- List of Renaissance and Medieval fairs

== Important figures from the Renaissance ==
List of Renaissance figures

- Byzantine scholars in the Renaissance
- List of Renaissance composers
  - List of English Renaissance composers
- List of Flemish painters
- List of Italian Renaissance female artists
- List of Renaissance commentators on Aristotle
- List of Renaissance humanists

=== Renaissance composers ===
List of Renaissance composers

=== Renaissance painters ===
Leonardo da Vinci with Michelangelo and Raphael form the traditional trinity of great masters of the Renaissance.

=== Renaissance philosophers ===
- Petrarch (1304–1374)
- Leonardo Bruni (1374–1444)
- Nicholas of Cusa (1401–1464)
- Lorenzo Valla (1405–1457)
- Marsilio Ficino (1433–1499)
- Pietro Pomponazzi (1462–1525)
- Pico della Mirandola (1463–1494)
- Desiderius Erasmus (1466–1536)
- Niccolò Machiavelli (1469–1527)
- Thomas More (1478–1535)
- Francisco de Vitoria (c.1480–1546)
- Martin Luther (1483–1546)
- Juan Luis Vives (1492–1540)
- Michel de Montaigne (1533–1592)
- Giordano Bruno (1548–1600)
- Francisco Suárez (1548–1617)
- Francis Bacon (1561–1626)
- Galileo Galilei (1564–1642)
- René Descartes (1596–1650)
- Tommaso Campanella (1568–1639)
- Franciscus Patricius (1529–1597)
- Hugo Grotius (1583–1645)
- Thomas Hobbes (1588–1679)
- Huldrych Zwingli (1484–1531)

== Renaissance scholarship ==
- Centre for Renaissance and Early Modern Studies
- Renaissance Studies

== Renaissance in popular culture ==
- Games based on the Renaissance
  - [Age of Renaissance]
  - Renaissance of Infantry

== See also ==
- Index of Renaissance articles
