= Jeremiah Owen =

British engineer (1802–1850)

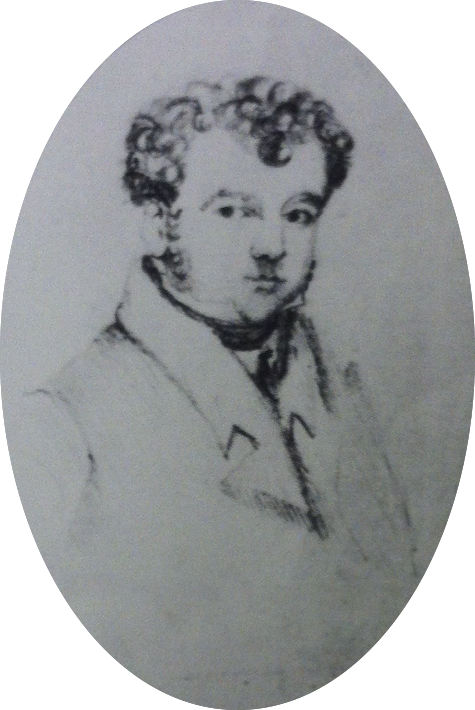
- Born: 22 February 1802; London, England
- Died: 2 August 1850 (aged 48); London
- Education: School of Naval Architecture
- Parent(s): Jacob Owen, Mary Underhill
- Relatives: Thomas Ellis Owen (brother), Joseph Butterworth Owen (brother), Sir Charles Lanyon (brother-in-law), Sir Owen Temple-Morris (great grandson), Baron Temple-Morris (great-great-grandson), David Lloyd Owen (great-grandson)
- Engineering career
- Discipline: Civil engineering, Naval architecture, Metallurgy
- Institutions: Royal Navy, Admiralty

Jeremiah Owen (22 February 1802 – 2 August 1850) was a mathematician, naval architect and Chief Metallurgist to the Admiralty during the first half of the nineteenth century. Owen took part in the debates over the professionalization of naval architecture in the Royal Navy and was active in campaigns for Polish human rights in the 1830s. He his chiefly known for his scientific work on metals in the design of naval vessels.

== Early life ==
Jeremiah Owen was the eldest son of the architect and engineer Jacob Owen and his wife Mary Underhill, through whom he was related to the mystic and pacifist Evelyn Underhill, Bishop Francis Underhill, the Professor of Anatomy and President of the Royal College of Physicians, Edinburgh Charles Edward Underhill, and the jurist and author, Sir Arthur Underhill. Owen was born in London in 1802, and spent his formative years in Portsmouth, where his father held several positions in the Royal Engineers before becoming principal architect and engineer, under John Fox Burgoyne’s leadership of the board of public works in Ireland. Unlike many of his brothers who became prominent architects in England and Ireland, Owen chose to follow a career in the navy and Admiralty.

== Education ==
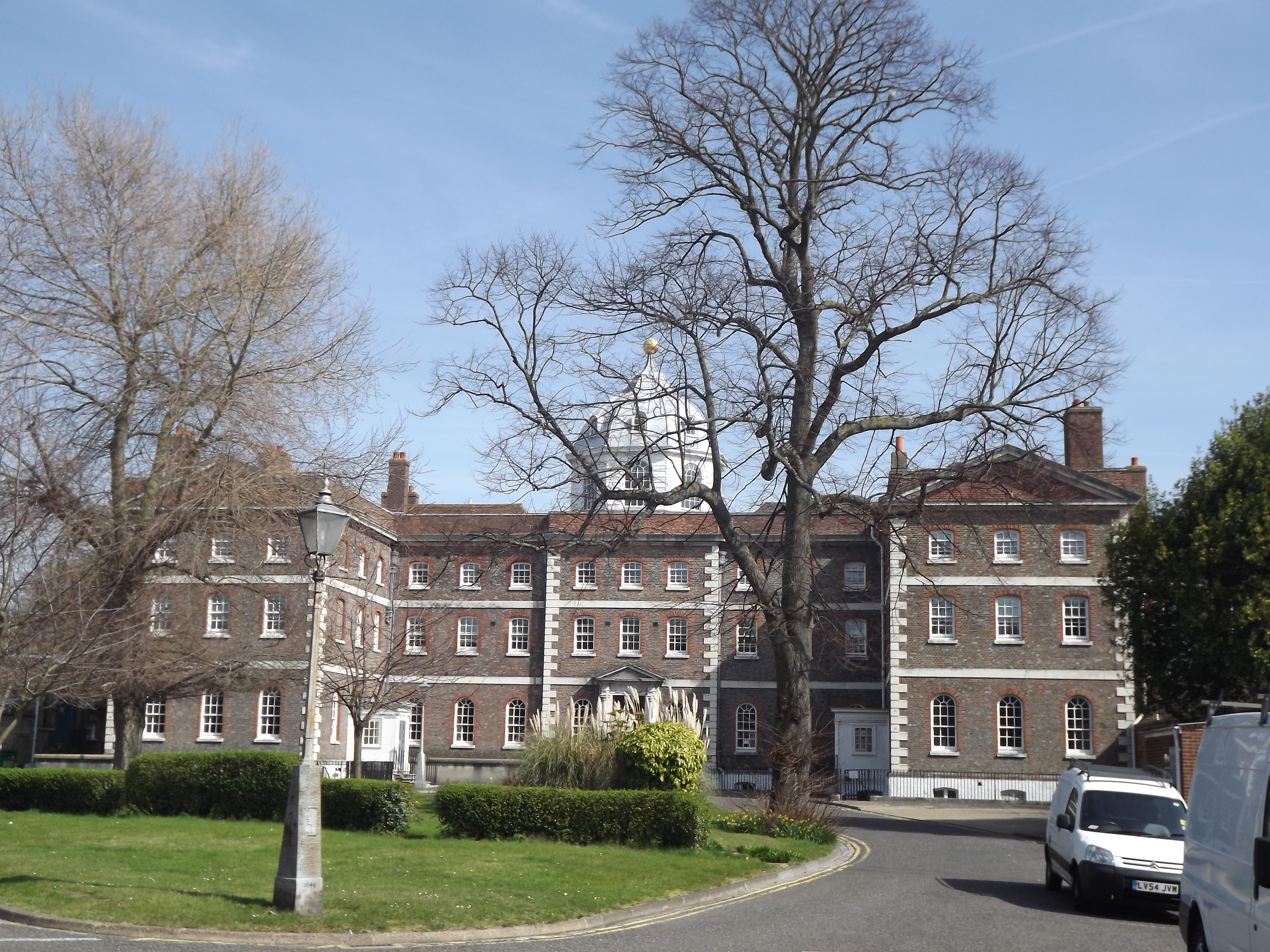
Royal Naval College and the School for Naval Architecture

Owen's path to becoming a naval architect seems largely to have been accidental. In 1816, when he was 14, the School of Naval Architecture was established at the Portsmouth Naval Base as part of the Royal Naval College. (Note: 1816 is often regarded as the foundational date of the School, but records show that students were accepted from 1811 onwards. 1816 marks the year in which purpose built facilities to accommodate the students were completed.) The new school enrolled scholars from age 14 and accepted him into the programme following a competitive examination. Training in advanced Euclidean Geometry (as well as the study of French, History, and Geography) earned scholars the moniker the 'Euclid Boys' from some quarters of the Navy. Until this time, it seems likely that he would follow one of his father's career paths in civil engineering or architecture, either within the Royal Engineers or by joining the elder Owen's private architectural practice based in Portsmouth, as did his younger brother Thomas Ellis Owen. Owen excelled in his chosen field. Graduating in 1825, he become one of the most prominent graduates of the school in the 1830s and 1840s.

== Debate over professionalising naval architecture ==
Almost from the beginning of his time at the School of Naval Architecture, Owen was drawn into the political struggle over the role of educational training as a pathway to the officer class. Though established almost a century earlier, the Royal Naval College and the School for Naval Architecture (Note: The establishment that eventually became the Royal Naval College and the School for Naval Architecture in 1816 was earlier known as the Royal Naval Academy, founded in 1733) was embroiled in an ever more wounding political assault from Whigs in the 1820s and 1830s as to the institutions' utility to the Royal Navy.

This attack on the college and school, which eventually led to their closures in 1837, traded on the belief that traditional models of naval apprenticeship offered the best route for training the officer class and master ship-wrights. Under this model, historians W.H Dickinson and D.K. Brown have argued, family ties and patronage, rather than meritocracy, were regarded as the favored method of recruitment.

=== Contribution to the Seppings debate ===
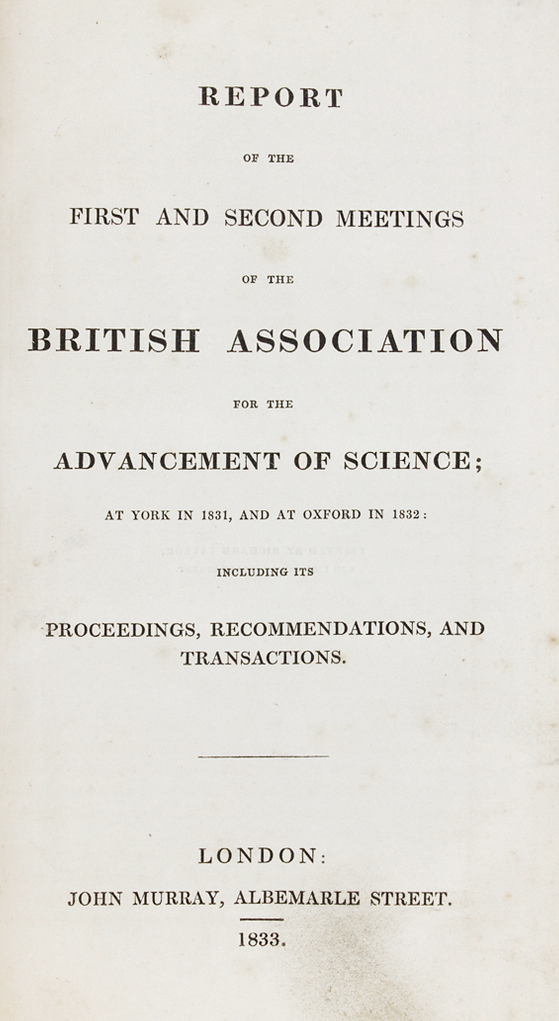
Report of the First and Second Meetings of the British Association for the Advancement of Science to which Owen contributed

Whig reforms of the Royal Navy which would bring about the dismissal of the eminent naval architect Robert Seppings as Surveyor of the Navy formed the immediate context for Owen's first known intervention in the wider debate in 1832. Sepping's support for scientific training in naval architecture, was matched by the dislike for the School of Naval Architecture by his proposed replacement, William Symonds. At the second meeting of the British Association for the Advancement of Science in June, Owen had encouraged the Association's members to promote the idea of large-scale scientific experimentation within government circles. His 'Remarks upon the Neglect of Naval Architecture in Great Britain' were read alongside George Harvey's suggestion for the 'cooperation of men of science [to study the subject of Naval Architecture], under the auspices of a public Board.' Neither Owen nor Harvey's suggestion found traction within the Navy. Their interventions had also come too late to help Seppings who had been forced to resign his position just six days earlier. The appointment of Symonds, an amateur ship designer, in Seppings’ place sealed the fate of the school.

=== Contribution to debate over scientific method in naval architecture ===
Competing positions about the relative merits of scientific training and established practice governed by rule of thumb emerged in Symonds’ subsequent moves against the School of Naval Architecture. At a presentation on naval architecture at the third meeting of the British Association for the Advancement of Science in June 1833, Owen continued to represent the case for academic discipline and funding of naval architecture. Arguing that only national governments could properly fund the scientific enquiry into naval architecture, he mounted the case for the continuation of scientific method to improve shipbuilding. He was also likely a contributor to a popular pamphlet, circulated a month earlier and widely believed to be authored by teachers and recent graduates of the School. The pamphlet questioned Seppings’ dismissal and the plight of naval architecture without proper funding. In it, the authors argued the case for scientific training and meritocratic appointments to the technical roles in the Navy.

Such was the notoriety of the pamphlet, that Captain Frederick Marryat wrote a rejoinder in The Metropolitan Magazine, launching a counterattack on its authors, who he named as the students and staff of the School. Marryat suggested that Sir Thomas Byam Martin’s descriptions of Owen and his fellow students as ‘highly gifted young men’ was preposterous. Marryat delved into the parentage of the students to suggest many were not the sons of gentlemen, and so could not harbor the talent Byam Martin ascribed to them. His vicious attack on the class background of many of the students conveniently excluded Owen, whose father was a leading architect in Ireland. But it revealed the ingrained prejudice within the Navy that the college and School faced in the years leading up to its abolition in 1837.

Like his classmate, Thomas Lloyd, Owen escaped the unfortunate fate of many of the school's scholars, having recently received promotion to a scientific position within the Admiralty. But the continuing gap left in the training of scientific officers would remain for the next twenty years. Ironically, his biographer, Mike Chrimes, has argued that family contacts, rather than meritocracy, were responsible for Owen gaining an important post in the Admiralty. There is no evidence for this claim. Rather Owen's assignment role as metallurgist to the Navy, first based at Portsmouth, was the result of Inman's recommendations in the 1831.

== Career ==
Following the School of Naval Architecture's closure in 1837, Owen and members of the school were all but sidelined for promotion to master shipwright positions. Newspaper accounts sympathetic to Owen recalled that he and other 'gentlemen of the late School of Naval Architecture' suffered as other less qualified officers were 'unjustly promoted' ahead of them. Survival required adaptation and retraining in specialist scientific fields. From the 1830s, it was reported that, 'seeing the discouragement which those of this class suffered in their strictly professional career, Mr. Owen turned his attention to the study of metals, and acquiring much experience in his new pursuit, was afforded the opportunity of practically applying it to the advantage of the Service.'

=== Metallurgist to the Navy ===
His turn to metallurgy was assisted by his former mentor at the School of Naval Architecture. In 1831, Professor James Inman recommended that he be placed in charge of the Navy's metal mills. The role was based initially at Chatham dockyard. By 1846, the new role of Chief Metallurgist (also known as Supervisor of metals) was created for him at the recommendation of the committee on metals. Owen remained in his specialist role for eighteen years, contributing to the Navy's scientific knowledge of the use of metals during that period. His role as Chief Metallurgist required extensive travel across the Navy's dockyards. His appointment was not without a familiar controversy. Despite his scientific credentials and research, criticisms of the appointment of ‘shipwright’ over an ‘officer of the trade’ followed Owen in his supervision of the Navy's smitheries.

=== Membership in Admiralty scientific committees ===
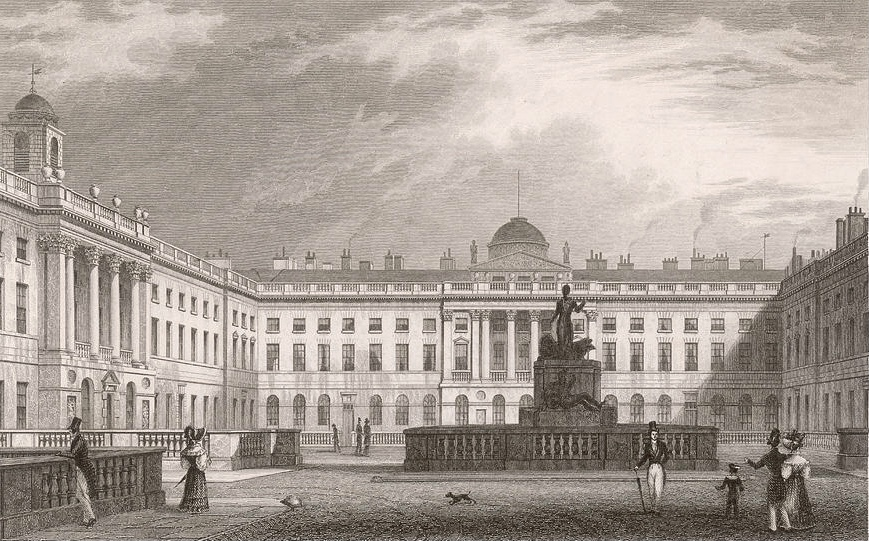
Owen was based at Somerset House from the 1830s

Based in Somerset House, Owen sat on a number of scientific committees, including the Admiralty Committee on Metals in the 1840s. Owen, along with his fellow committee members visited numerous dockyards and private establishments in the course of their inquiry. Many of the published findings of the committee continued to find an audience into the 1860s and 1870s. However, at the time, Owen's fellow committee member, James Nasmyth, acknowledged that ‘I have reason to know that many of the recommendations of the committee, though cordially acknowledged by the higher powers, were by a sort of passive resistance practically shelved.’ Elsewhere, Owen acted on the Admiralty Committee on Dockyard Manufacturing, publishing reports on metals central to the expansion of the navy in the nineteenth century.

=== Later career and premature death ===
Criticism of Owen's lack of apprenticeship-based training in the smithies that he supervised followed him. The role of Chief Metallurgist was abolished in 1849. Reasons for this were unclear. It was later reported that his 'special office' had come 'within the range of the economical fit of the Admiralty'. Other more critical descriptions of the role in the press labelled it as 'a mere sinecure,' presumably designed to keep Owen salaried while he carried out his substantive work as a scientific officer on the Committee of metals. There is some reason to dispute this characterisation of the role as calls for the re-establishment of the role were voiced over the next decade.

Owen died after a brief illness in August 1850. (Note: The death of his daughter Emily from consumption, also at Woolwich, occurred within a month of Owen's own death, suggesting that a bout of Tuberculosis was also the cause.) His premature death cut short his career. Opportunities for naval architects over the lean years of the 1840s meant that he was forced to take up a non-scientific role in the Navy, though he continued to be based at Somerset House and retained his former salary. Within the next decade, Owen's close associates, Isaac Watts and Thomas Lloyd went on to design the Warrior-class ironclads. Joseph Woolley noted in the 1860s that, for a generation of naval architects educated at the School of Naval Architecture in the 1820s and 1830s, ‘the value of their services, were for many years—the best years of their lives—lost to the country.’ A decade after his death, the Royal Institution of Naval Architects was founded, followed four years later by the re-established Royal School of Naval Architecture in 1864.

== Professional memberships ==
Owen was a life member of the British Association for the Advancement of Science, and presented at the association during its third conference in 1833. He was in the same intake of members to the Institution of Civil Engineers as Isambard Brunel, Britain's most famed civil engineer of the nineteenth century. Owen resigned in 1831, upon taking up his commission with the Admiralty at Somerset House.

== Polish relief committee work ==
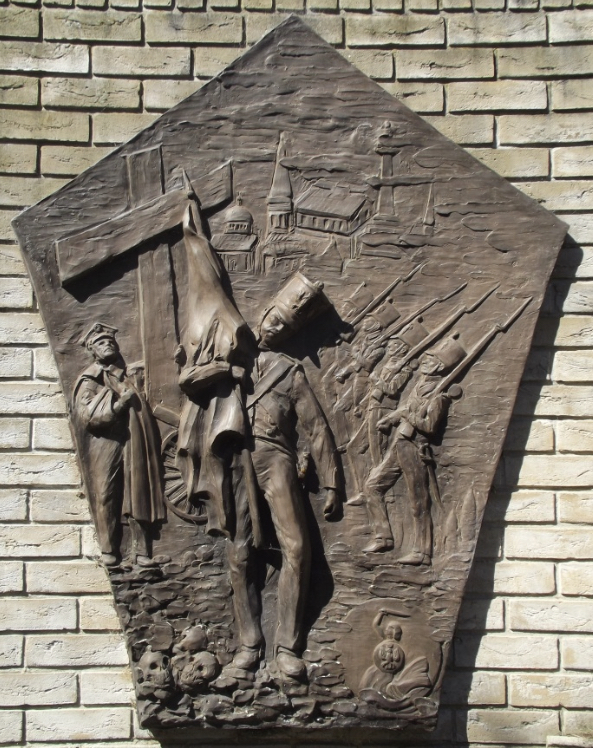
Polish Refugee Memorial - Soldiers of Gdansk 1834

=== Response to the Marianne, 1834 ===
In 1834, a Polish refugee community was founded in Portsmouth after the Marianne, carrying 212 Polish deportees from Prussia, landed there. The appalling conditions they had suffered in Prussian labour camps following the November uprising and their forced deportation to the United States drew Owen's attention. That year, Owen numbered among a few Englishmen and women in Portsmouth whose ‘noble feelings’ were said to have led them to support the cause of Polish liberation. He soon formed a relief committee for the Polish refugees. Historian Peter Brock notes that Owen was one of the most active members of the committee along with Augustus Creuze, Henry Craddock, and W.R. Lang. The fact that all had been Owen's contemporaries at the School of Naval Architecture suggests he was also the committee's most active recruiter. His brother Thomas Ellis Owen, later mayor of Portsmouth, and James Bennett, another former student of the school, are also listed amongst the committee's members. The plight of the deportees soon drew the attention of Lord Dudley Stuart whose intervention helped secure their eventual asylum in Portsmouth.

=== Commemoration of 1834 relief campaign ===
The role of the Polish relief committee and the people of Portsmouth in raising awareness of the Marianne 212 deportees is commemorated in a memorial which proclaims in Polish and English: ‘Lest we forget the kindness shown and the help given by the people of Britain’s premier naval port – Portsmouth to 212 Polish soldiers, members of the first Polish community in Britain, who arrived in Portsmouth in February 1834, after having taken part in the November uprising against Tzarist Russian oppression, which took place in Warsaw in 1830 – 1831. The majority of those soldiers were laid to rest in this very place in a common grave. At a time when merchants of human rights joined forces in order to destroy liberty – the people of Portsmouth rallied to the aid of those, who fought for that liberty.’

=== Response to the Irtysz, 1844 ===
Polish historian Żurawski vel Grajewski has suggested that Owen was suspected as an accomplice to the 1844 escape of eleven Polish soldiers from the Irtysz while it docked at Portsmouth. Over the 1830s and 1840s, the Polish relief committee assisted the campaign for Polish liberation through active assistance publicising the cause in print and through public lecture series, such as that carried out by Captain Franciszek Stawiarski at the beginning of 1844. Throughout the same period, Portsmouth's Polish community quickly became an intellectual melting pot of socialists and communists as the émigrés became embroiled in debates over private and common land ownership in a liberated Poland. The public facing debates that captured the local Portsmouth community were far more targeted at British sympathies for Polish nationalism. But when a Russian ship landed in Portsmouth carrying Polish soldiers bound for exile in Siberia in 1844, members of the Polish expatriate community, perhaps recalling their own uncertain fate a decade earlier, were not willing to rely on public sympathy and English intervention. Eleven of the imprisoned soldiers were smuggled from the Portsmouth Dockyard prison. Owen's role in the escape remains unclear. Captain Franciszek Stawiarski's published letters suggests Owen had no knowledge of the soldiers escape plans although he himself had orchestrated their passage to London under the protection of Lord Stuart. It is known that Owen was called on to intervene in the matter on behalf of the watch who risked losing his rank without the return of the prisoners. Given his position on the relief committee there was little reason to think Owen believed the expatriate community would give the escaped prisoners up in the face of certain exile. Owen contacted his friend and leader in the Portsmouth community Captain Stawiarski and quickly accepted his principled silence as to the soldiers whereabouts. Although Stawiarski made public his account of the escape, including Owen's letters, there seems to have been no diplomatic repercussions from their publication.

== Private life ==
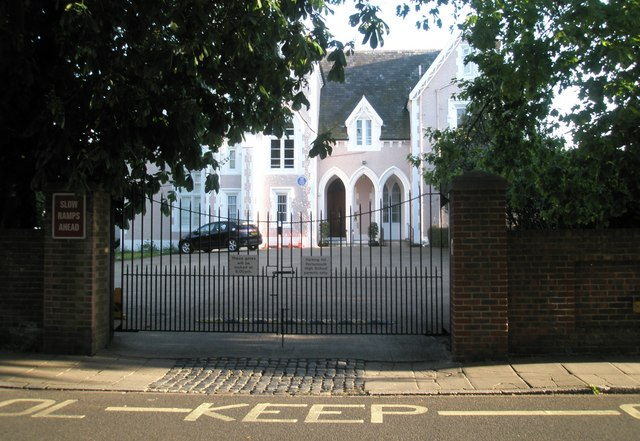
Swiss Cottage, Jeremiah and Lydia Owen's family home from the 1830s

Owen came from a noted family of architects. However, with their departure for Ireland in the 1830s, only his brother Thomas Ellis Owen remained with him in Portsmouth. The brothers were both involved in the development of Southsea, Thomas becoming mayor of Portsmouth for the first time in 1847.

Owen had a large family with his wife Lydia. The family lived at Swiss Cottage, Southsea, designed by Thomas. His death at 48 left Lydia with ten children to raise. His eldest son, Thomas Edward Owen, a doctor, became mayor of Totnes. His second eldest son, Col Charles Lanyon Owen CB became a Portsmouth magistrate on his retirement from active service. Another son, Alfred Lloyd Owen, also a doctor, became a vice-president of the British Medical Association. Within a month of Owen's death, his eldest daughter Emily died of consumption at Woolwich. His second daughter Catherine, died four years later in 1854. A third daughter, Charlotte, married William Watts, son of fellow naval architect Isaac Watts. Following Owen's death, his wife Lydia returned to Southsea, living in Lainson Lodge, also designed by Thomas Ellis Owen, until her death aged 66.
