= Thomas Lloyd (naval architect) =

British naval architect and inventor

Thomas Lloyd CB
- Born: 29 October 1803; Shrewsbury, England
- Died: 19 March 1875 (aged 71)
- Education: School of Naval Architecture
- Engineering career
- Discipline: Civil engineering, Naval architecture
- Institutions: Royal Navy
- Awards: Companion of the Order of Bath

Thomas Lloyd CB (1803–1875) was an English naval architect and engineer of the nineteenth century known principally for his work on the development of the marine engine in the Royal Navy.

== Biography ==
=== Early life and education ===
Thomas Lloyd was born at Portsea, Portsmouth, on 23 October 1803. There he received his early education with Rev John Neave. He then proceeded to the School of Naval Architecture, where his father was a practical instructor. Following a competitive examination, Lloyd entered the school on the 1 June 1819. Tutored by some of the foundational educators of Naval Architecture in Britain, including James Inman, Lloyd was part of a cohort of leading naval architects in England which included the likes of Augustin Francis Bullock Creuze, William Morgan, Isaac Watts, and Jeremiah Owen who emerged from the school in the 1820s before its closure due to political interference in 1837. Lloyd passed his studies with distinction and left on the 1 January 1826.

=== Early career ===
Lloyd's first appointment was to Plymouth dockyard where he was employed as a supernumerary officer to acquire information as to the conduct of the general duties and business of the dockyards. Following a further appointment in the design of ships in the Designers Department in the Naval Office, in 1831 he sailed on the Columbine, a vessel within the navy's experimental squadrons, for six months to gain a practical knowledge of the behaviour of ships at sea. In 1831, James Inman recommended that Lloyd be in charge of the wood mill and block making machinery. Lloyd gained important knowledge of steam machinery during his time in the role and he instead became inspector of steam machinery at Woolwich, graduating to become assistant to Peter Ewart, then the Chief Engineer and Inspector of Machinery.

=== Chief Engineer of the Navy ===
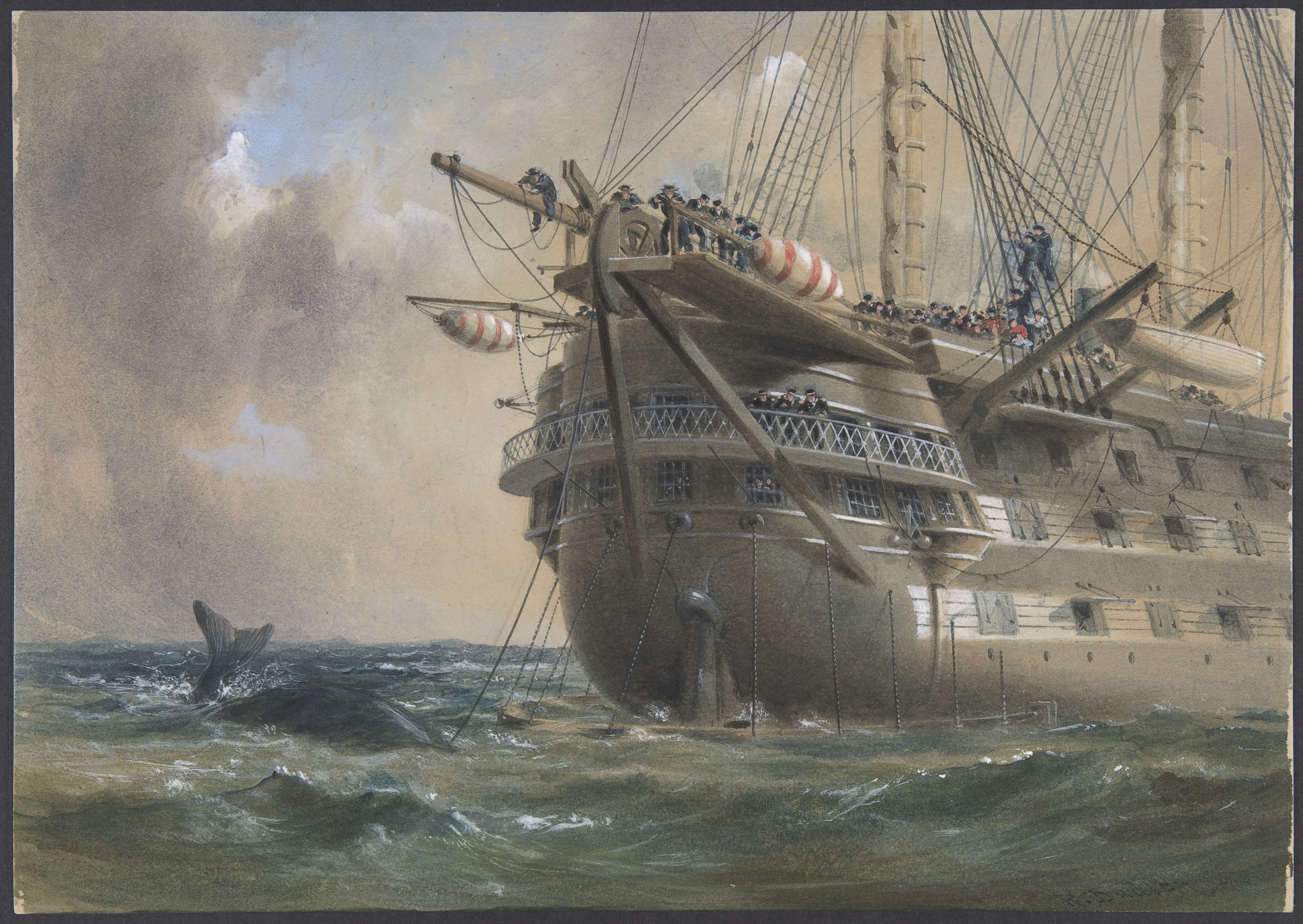
HMS Agamemnon laying the Atlantic Telegraph Cable in 1858

Lloyd quickly climbed the ranks of the Navy's scientific establishment. Following Ewart's death in 1842, Lloyd became Chief Engineer and inspector of Machinery at Woolwich. He held this position for five years, mainly conducting inspection of machinery throughout England and Scotland, and sitting on several important scientific commissions. During this time, he made crucial investigations and experiments into screw propellers, establishing the superiority of Sir Francis Pettit Smith’s invention over the paddlewheels then in use in the Navy. In 1847, he moved to the Admiralty where he was appointed Chief Engineer of the Navy.

Following the 1851 Exhibition, Lloyd and several of along with Sir Joseph Whitworth, John Penn, and Isaac Watts were granted permission by the French Government to visit their arsenals. Their inspection of the Napoleon's screw engines led the royal Navy to commission HMS Agamemnon. Fitted with engines of 600 horsepower, the Agamemnon gained speeds greater than had been contemplated previously and was considered a great success by contemporaries. This development indirectly led to the Agamemnon laying the first submarine communications cable connecting England with America in the 1850s, which Lloyd was asked to participate in by the Atlantic Telegraph Company. When the combined French and English fleets were preparing to go to the Baltic in 1856, Lloyd suggested solid armour plates to protect the fleets of both navies. The idea was subsequently taken up. Gloire, built by the French, and HMS Warrior, by the English, were the first to adopt the system that would revolutionise naval warfare. Lloyd witnessed the effects of plating war ships during the Crimean War.

=== Later life ===
Lloyd took retirement in 1869. The year prior he was made companion to the Order of Bath. In recommending his investment, Sir Robert Spencer Robinson noted that "[t]o Mr. Lloyd, more than to anyone else, is due the successful application of the screw to the propulsion of steam-ships; and it was owing to his enlightened knowledge and his zealous exertions that the Royal Navy was enabled to take the lead in its application to ships of war." Lloyd survived to see the revival of the profession of naval architecture, which had sustained severe setbacks during the 1840s and 1850s, and he became the Vice President of the Institution of Naval Architecture, which was formed in the 1860s. Lloyd died of a seizure in 1875.
