= William McPherson Rice =

English architect and master Shipwright

William McPherson Rice (1796–1868) was an English Naval Architect and Master Shipwright.

== Early life ==
William McPherson Rice was born in Portsea, Hampshire on May 1, 1796, the son of William McPherson Rice, a ships mate and Ann Stigant.

Rice senior had seen action aboard HMS Blonde during the American Revolutionary War. His mother died in childbirth the following year and his father died in 1800. (There are no records of any siblings surviving infancy.)

In 1813 Rice entered the School of Naval Architecture in Portsmouth.

== Career ==
Rice held appointments in various naval dockyards (Deptford Dockyard, Portsmouth Dockyard, Chatham Dockyard) between 1819 and 1822 when he became draughtsman to Sir Robert Seppings (1767-1840) in Chatham. In 1822-23 he assisted in the excavation and investigation of an ancient vessel found in the River Rother, East Sussex. Rice's report suggested a less ancient provenance for the vessel than much of the sensational conjecture at the time. The Society of Antiquaries of London included the full text of Rice's report on the vessel in Volume XX of their journal Archaeologia; or, Miscellaneous Tracts relating to Antiquity.

In 1824 he sailed via Lisbon and Madeira to South America aboard the frigate HMS Aurora (1814) to assist in repairing HMS Spartiate. The journal he kept while on this journey is held in the collection of the Royal Museums Greenwich as are the log books of the ships Aurora and HMS Blanche (1819) on which he returned.

After his return from the South American Station to Chatham-Kent and his marriage in 1825 he was appointed Foreman of the Portsmouth Dockyard.

In 1837 he led a team of shipwrights to Rathmullan on Lough Swilly to refloat and repair the beached HMS Terror, which, under the command of Captain George Back (1796-1878), had returned from the Arctic badly damaged by the ice. Rice's repairs, which enabled Terror to sail to the Royal Navy's Chatham Dockyard, are commended by Back in his complete Narrative of the 1836-37 voyage and Rice's correspondence with Captain Back and his own report on the repairs completed are held in the Royal Museums Greenwich collection.

== Later life ==
In 1844 he was promoted to Assistant Master Shipwright and in 1852 was appointed Master Shipwright at Pembroke Dockyard but held that office for less than a year.

== Death ==
On February 11, 1868, Rice died at his cottage in Hastings aged 71 and was buried in the parish of St Clement, Halton.

== Family life ==
On 25 June 1825, Rice married Fanny Turner at St. Nicholas church in Plumstead and they lived adjacent to the Chatham Dockyard in Brompton where all of their eight children were born. Three of their children died in infancy. After the birth of their youngest daughter, they moved to Rainham still close to the dockyard.
