= Rede Lecture =

The Sir Robert Rede's Lecturer is an annual appointment to give a public lecture, the Sir Robert Rede's Lecture (usually Rede Lecture) at the University of Cambridge. It is named for Sir Robert Rede, who was Chief Justice of the Common Pleas in the sixteenth century.

== Initial series ==
The initial series of lectures ranges from around 1668 to around 1856. In principle, there were three lectureships each year, on Logic, Philosophy and Rhetoric. These differed from the later individual lectures, in that they were appointments to a lectureship for a period of time, rather than an appointment for a one-off annual lecture. There was also a Mathematics lectureship which dated from an earlier time, while another term used was "Barnaby Lecturer", as the lecturers were elected on St Barnabas Day. A selection of the lecturers, who tended to have studied at Cambridge and be appointed after becoming Fellows of a College, is given below, with a full listing given in the sources.

=== Mathematics Lecturers ===
- 1550 James Pilkington
- 1593 William Alabaster
- 1641 Ralph Cudworth
- 1643 Nathaniel Culverwell

=== Barnaby Lecturers ===
- 1776 Thomas Starkie the Elder (Mathematics)
- 1738 Charles Moss (Mathematics)
- 1746 John Berridge (Mathematics)
- 1755 John Michell (Mathematics)
- 1758 Thomas Postlethwaite (Mathematics)
- 1763 John Jebb (Mathematics)
- 1765 Richard Watson (Mathematics)
- 1770 William Paley (Mathematics)
- 1783 William Farish (Mathematics)
- 1789 Francis John Hyde Wollaston (Mathematics)
- 1807 Robert Woodhouse (Mathematics)
- 1831 John Stevens Henslow (Mathematics)
- 1842 David Thomas Ansted (Mathematics)
- 1846 George Gabriel Stokes (Mathematics)
- 1851 Henry Richards Luard (Mathematics)
- 1855 Richard Shilleto (Mathematics)

=== Rede Lecturers ===
- 1706 John Addenbrooke (Logic)
- 1717 John Addenbrooke (Logic)
- 1723 John Jortin (Rhetoric)
- 1730 Edmund Law (Rhetoric)
- 1740 Thomas Pyle (Rhetoric)
- 1763 Richard Watson (Philosophy)
- 1764 John Jebb (Rhetoric)
- 1781 George Pretyman (Philosophy)
- 1783 Isaac Milner (Philosophy)
- 1785 William Farish (Logic)
- 1785 Joseph Dacre Carlyle (Rhetoric)
- 1794 Bewick Bridge (Logic)
- 1796 Bewick Bridge (Logic)
- 1798 George Butler (Logic)
- 1803 Bewick Bridge (Rhetoric)
- 1805 Ralph Tatham (Philosophy)
- 1806 George Cecil Renouard (Philosophy)
- 1809 Henry Bickersteth (Logic)
- 1812 John Kaye (Logic)
- 1819 George Peacock (Philosophy)
- 1822 Connop Thirlwall (Logic)
- 1825 John Stevens Henslow (Philosophy)
- 1828 Joshua King (Rhetoric)
- 1837 Edward Harold Browne (Philosophy)
- 1838 Samuel Earnshaw (Philosophy)
- 1843 John William Colenso (Philosophy)
- 1844 Joseph Woolley (Rhetoric)
- 1846 Hugh Andrew Johnstone Munro (Philosophy)
- 1850 Charles Anthony Swainson (Logic)
- 1851 John James Stewart Perowne (Philosophy)
- 1853 John Couch Adams (Philosophy)
- 1853 John James Stewart Perowne (Rhetoric)

== New series ==
From 1858, the lecture was re-established as a one-off annual lecture, delivered by a person appointed by the Vice-Chancellor of the university. The names of the appointees and the titles of their lectures are given below.

=== 1858-1899 ===
- 1859 Richard Owen On the classifaction and geographical distribution of the Mammalia
- 1860 John Phillips Life on the earth, its origin and succession
- 1861 Robert Willis The social and architectural history of Trinity College
- 1862 Edward Sabine The cosmical features of terrestrial magnetism
- 1863 David Thomas Ansted The correlation of the natural history sciences
- 1864 George Biddell Airy The late observations of total eclipses of the sun, and the inferences from them
- 1865 John Tyndall On Radiation
- 1866 William Thomson The dissipation of energy
- 1867 John Ruskin The relation of national ethics to national art
- 1868 Friedrich Max Müller On the stratification of language
- 1869 William Huggins On the results of spectrum analysis of the heavenly bodies
- 1870 William Allen Miller On some chemical processes of forming organic compounds, with illustrations from the coal tar colours
- 1871 Joseph Norman Lockyer Recent solar discoveries
- 1872 Edward Augustus Freeman The Unity of History
- 1873 Peter Guthrie Tait Thermo-electricity
- 1874 Samuel White Baker Slavery
- 1875 Henry James Sumner Maine The effects of observation of India upon modern European thought
- 1876 Samuel Birch The monumental history of ancient Egypt
- 1877 Charles Wyville Thomson On some of the results of the expedition of H.M.S. Challenger
- 1878 James Clerk Maxwell On the telephone
- 1879 William Henry Dallinger 'The origin of life, illustrated by the life histories of the least and lowest organisms in nature'
- 1880 George Murray Humphry 'Man, prehistoric, present, future'
- 1881 William Muir The early Caliphate
- 1882 Matthew Arnold Literature and Science
- 1883 Thomas Henry Huxley 'The origin of the existing forms of animal life: construction or evolution?
- 1884 Francis Galton The Measurement of Human Faculty
- 1885 George John Romanes Mind and motion
- 1886 John Lubbock, 1st Baron Avebury On the forms of seedlings and the causes to which they are due
- 1887 John Robert Seeley Greater Britain in the Georgian and in the Victorian era
- 1888 Frederick Augustus Abel Applications of science to the protection of human life
- 1889 George Gabriel Stokes On some effects of the action of light on ponderable matter
- 1890 Richard Claverhouse Jebb Erasmus
- 1891 Alfred Comyn Lyall Natural religion in India
- 1892 Thomas George Bonney The microscope's contributions to the earth's physical history
- 1893 Michael Foster Weariness
- 1894 John Willis Clark Libraries in the Medieval and Renaissance Periods
- 1895 Mandell Creighton The Early Renaissance in England
- 1896 J. J. Thomson Röntgen rays
- 1897 Arthur William Rücker Recent researches on terrestrial magnetism
- 1898 Henry Irving The theatre in its relation to the state
- 1899 Marie Alfred Cornu La théorie des ondes lumineuses: son influence sur la physique moderne

=== 1900-1949 ===
- 1900 Frederic Harrison Byzantine history in the early middle age
- 1901 Frederic William Maitland English Law and the Renaissance
- 1902 Osborne Reynolds On an inversion of ideas as to the structure of the Universe
- 1903 George Walter Prothero Napoleon III and the Second Empire
- 1904 James Alfred Ewing The structure of metals
- 1905 Francis Edward Younghusband Our true relationship with India
- 1906 William Mitchell Ramsay The wars between Moslem and Christian for the possession of Asia Minor
- 1907 Aston Webb The art of architecture, and the training required to practise it
- 1908 Ernest Mason Satow An Austrian diplomatist in the fifties
- 1909 Archibald Geikie Charles Darwin as Geologist
- 1910 Charles Harding Firth The parallel between the English and American Civil Wars
- 1911 Charles Algernon Parsons The Steam Turbine
- 1912 George Gilbert Aimé Murray The chorus in Greek tragedy
- 1913 George Nathaniel Curzon Modern Parliamentary Eloquence
- 1914 Norman Moore St Bartholomew's Hospital in peace and war
- 1915 Frederic George Kenyon Ideals and characteristics of English culture
- 1916 George Forrest Browne The ancient cross-shafts of Bewcastle and Ruthwell
- 1917 Richard Tetley Glazebrook Science and industry
- 1918 Louis Alexander Mountbatten, 1st Marquess of Milford Haven The Royal Navy, 1815–1915
- 1919 Lord Moulton, Science and War
- 1920 James Scorgie Meston, 1st Baron Meston India at the crossways
- 1921 William Napier Shaw The air and its ways
- 1922 William Ralph Inge The Victorian Age
- 1923 Hendrik Antoon Lorentz Clerk Maxwell's electromagnetic theory
- 1924 Herbert Hensley Henson Byron
- 1925 Hugh Walpole Some notes on the evolution of the English novel
- 1926 Arthur Mayger Hind Claude Lorrain and modern art
- 1927 Josiah Stamp On stimulus in the economic life
- 1928 Michael Ernest Sadler Thomas Day: an English disciple of Rousseau
- 1929 John Buchan The Causal and the Casual in History
- 1930 James Hopwood Jeans The mysterious universe, resulting in the book The Mysterious Universe
- 1931 George Stuart Gordon Robert Bridges
- 1932 Edgar Allison Peers St. John of the Cross
- 1933 Charles Scott Sherrington Brain and its mechanism
- 1934 Hugh Pattison Macmillan Two ways of thinking
- 1935 Alfred Daniel Hall The pace of progress
- 1936 Cedric Webster Hardwicke The drama to-morrow
- 1937 Harold George Nicolson The Meaning Of Prestige
- 1938 Patrick Playfair Laidlaw Virus diseases and viruses
- 1939 Edward Mellanby Some social and economic implications of the recent advances in medical science
- 1940 Augustus Moore Daniel Some approaches to judgment in painting
- 1941 E. M. Forster Virginia Woolf
- 1942 Archibald MacLeish American opinion of the war
- 1943 Max Beerbohm Lytton Strachey's writings
- 1944 Richard Winn Livingstone Plato and modern education
- 1945 Norman Birkett National Parks and the countryside
- 1946 Edward Victor Appleton Terrestrial magnetism and the ionosphere
- 1947 Hubert Douglas Henderson The uses and abuses of economic planning
- 1948 Walter Hamilton Moberly Universities and the state
- 1949 Ernest William Barnes Religion and turmoil

=== 1950-1999 ===
- 1950 Edward Bridges Portrait of a Profession
- 1951 Cecil Maurice Bowra Inspiration and poetry
- 1952 Walter Russell Brain The Contribution of Medicine to our Idea of the Mind
- 1953 Arthur Duncan Gardner The proper study of mankind
- 1954 Charles Alfred Coulson Science and religion: a changing relationship
- 1955 Lord David Cecil Walter Pater - the Scholar Artist
- 1956 John Betjeman The English Town in the Last Hundred Years
- 1957 Robert Wyndham Ketton-Cremer Matthew Prior
- 1958 Charles Galton Darwin The problems of world population
- 1959 C. P. Snow The Two Cultures and the Scientific Revolution
- 1960 Edgar Wind Classicism
- 1961 Lord Radcliffe Censors
- 1962 Robert Hall Planning
- 1963 Douglas William Logan The Years of Challenge
- 1964 Kenneth Hurlstone Jackson The oldest Irish tradition - a window on the early Iron Age
- 1965 Gavin de Beer Genetics and prehistory
- 1966 Harold McCarter Taylor Why should we study the Anglo-Saxons?
- 1967 Kenneth Wheare The university in the news
- 1968 Patrick Arthur Devlin, Lord Devlin The House of Lords and the Naval Prize Bill 1911
- 1969 Patrick Maynard Stuart Blackett The gap widens
- 1970 Kenneth Clark The artist grows old
- 1971 Herbert Butterfield The discontinuities between the generations in History: their effect on the transmission of political experience
- 1972 None
- 1973 Kingsley Dunham Non-renewable resources - a dilemma
- 1974 Walter Laing Macdonald Perry Higher education for adults: where more means better
- 1975 Alfred Alistair Cooke The American in England: from Emerson to S. J. Perelman
- 1976 Rupert Cross The golden thread of English Criminal Law: the burden of proof
- 1977 Richard Southern The historical experience
- 1978 Margaret Gowing Reflections on Atomic Energy History
- 1979 The Duke of Edinburgh Philosophy, politics and administration
- 1980 Shirley Williams Technology, employment, and change
- 1981 Frederick Sydney Dainton British universities: purposes, problems, and pressures
- 1982 Fred Hoyle Facts and Dogmas in Cosmology and Elsewhere
- 1983 David Towry Piper The increase of learning and other great objects
- 1984 Sir Clive Sinclair A time for change
- 1985 Brian Urquhart The United Nations and international law
- 1986 David Attenborough Islands
- 1987 Sir John Thompson A reconsideration of the ideas underlying the international system
- 1988 Roy Jenkins Lord Jenkins of Hillhead; 'An Oxford view of Cambridge'
- 1989 Peter Alexander Ustinov Communication
- 1990 The Princess Royal What is Punishment for and How Does it Relate to the Concept of Community?
- 1991 Peter Swinnerton-Dyer Policy on Higher Education and Research
- 1993 L. M. Singhvi A Tale of Three Cities
- 1994 Geoffrey Howe Nationalism and the Nation State
- 1996 Mary Robinson Civil Society: Renewal At Work
- 1997 Leon Brittan Globalisation vs. Sovereignty? The European Response
- 1998 Rosalyn Higgins International Law in a Changing Legal System

=== 2000 onwards ===
- 2009 Wen Jiabao See China in the Light of Her Development
- 2010 Onora O'Neill The Two Cultures Fifty Years On
- 2011 Harold Varmus The Purpose and Conduct of Science
- 2012 Lord Turner of Ecchinswell The Purpose of the University: Knowledge and Human Wellbeing in the Modern Economy
- 2015 Drew Gilpin Faust Two Wars and the Long Twentieth Century: the United States, 1861–65; Britain 1914–18
- 2017 Sue Desmond-Hellmann Facts or Fear? The Case for Facts
- 2019 Jane Goodall Reasons for Hope
- 2024 Mary Beard (classicist) The boy who breathed on the glass at the British Museum
- 2026 Lorraine Daston Reason versus rationality: A history
