= School of Mathematics and Naval Construction =

Coordinates: 50°48′1″N 1°6′26″W

Central School of Mathematics and Naval Construction
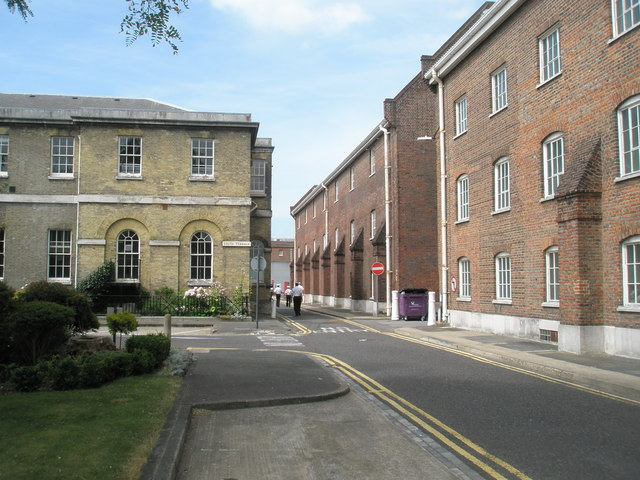
- Part of the 1815 building (left) in Portsmouth Dockyard alongside 18th-century storehouses (right)
- Active: 1848–1853
- Country: United Kingdom
- Branch: Royal Navy
- Type: Training
- Role: Mathematics and Naval Construction
- Garrison/HQ: Portsmouth

The Central School of Mathematics and Naval Construction was a short-lived shipbuilding college at Portsmouth Dockyard on the south coast of England. It was founded in 1848 but only lasted five years, until 1853. The first Principal was Joseph Woolley, who in 1864 would found the Royal School of Naval Architecture and Marine Engineering in South Kensington that became part of the Royal Naval College, Greenwich in 1873.

== Building ==
The school was sited in the dockyard at Portsea, Portsmouth in the building formerly used by the School of Naval Architecture (1816–1832), facing the Commissioner’s house and Old Naval Academy. It is 176 ft (53.6 m) long by 45 ft (13.7 m) wide and 36 ft (11.0 m) high, to a design by Edward/Edmund Hall. Construction began in 1815 and was completed in 1817. The building has since seen use as a residence, Port Admirals Office, Tactical School, War College, NATO and Naval HQ and C in C Western Fleet Offices.

== Education ==
The School of Mathematics and Naval Construction was intended as a finishing school for a select number of shipwright apprentices, to prepare them as officers in the dockyards. They were sent to the school for the final three years of their seven-year apprenticeship, to be taught mathematics by Wooley and shipbuilding by the master shipwright of the dockyard. Unusually, they were also taught chemistry in a laboratory created at the back of the school for the use of W.J. Hay, the chemical assistant of the dockyard.

== Alumni ==
- Sir Edward James Reed - Chief Constructor of the Royal Navy from 1863 until 1870
- Sir Nathaniel Barnaby - Reed's successor and brother-in-law
- Frederick Kynaston Barnes - Naval Architect
