= Joseph Woolley =

The Reverend Joseph Woolley MA LLD FRAS (1817-1889) was a fellow of the Royal Astronomical Society and a founding member of the Royal Institution of Naval Architects.

== Early life and education ==
Woolley was born in Petersfield, Hampshire on 27 June 1817. He was the third son of George Woolley, a local surgeon, and later employee of the Royal Humane Society and his wife Charlotte. Woolley was educated at Brompton Grammar School and St John's College, Cambridge in 1835. He graduated BA as third Wrangler in 1840, and became a Fellow and Lecturer at St John's College, and was Rede Lecturer in 1844. In 1846, Woolley gave up his post to become a country rector.

== Career in Naval Architecture ==
Woolley's career in naval architecture began when he was appointed was the first Principal of the short-lived School of Mathematics and Naval Construction, Portsmouth which ran from 1848 to 1853. Its predecessor, the School of Naval Architecture, led by Professor James Inman, another Cambridge graduate, had closed in the 1830s. like the earlier school, the School was distrusted by those without academic training, who referred to its graduates as 'Euclid boys.' In 1864, Woolley became the first principal of the Royal School of Naval Architecture.

== Family connections ==
He was related to the 20th-century astronomer Richard van der Riet Woolley (Joseph Woolley was the brother of Benjamin Woolley, Richard van der Riet Woolley's paternal grandfather).

== Sources ==
- H. W.Dickinson, 'Joseph Woolley - Pioneer of British Naval Education; 1848 - 1873', Education Research and Perspectives (2007) 34(1) pages 1–26
- Richard van der Riet Woolley biography, including Woolley family history
