= Shagin =

Shagin (Russian: Ша́гин) is a Russian surname. Notable people with the surname include:

- Alex Shagin (born 1947), Soviet and Russian coin designer
- Anton Shagin (Russian: Антон Александрович Шагин; born 1984), Russian actor
- Dmitry Shagin (Russian: Дмитрий Владимирович Шагин)
- Ivan Shagin (Russian: Иван Михайлович Шагин)
- Vladimir Shagin (Russian: Владимир Николаевич Шагин)
- Shagin Law Group, a law firm in Harrisburg, Pennsylvania, founded in 1996 as Shagin and Anstine by Craig Shagin
