= Renaissance of Sumer =

Historical period of Mesopotamia

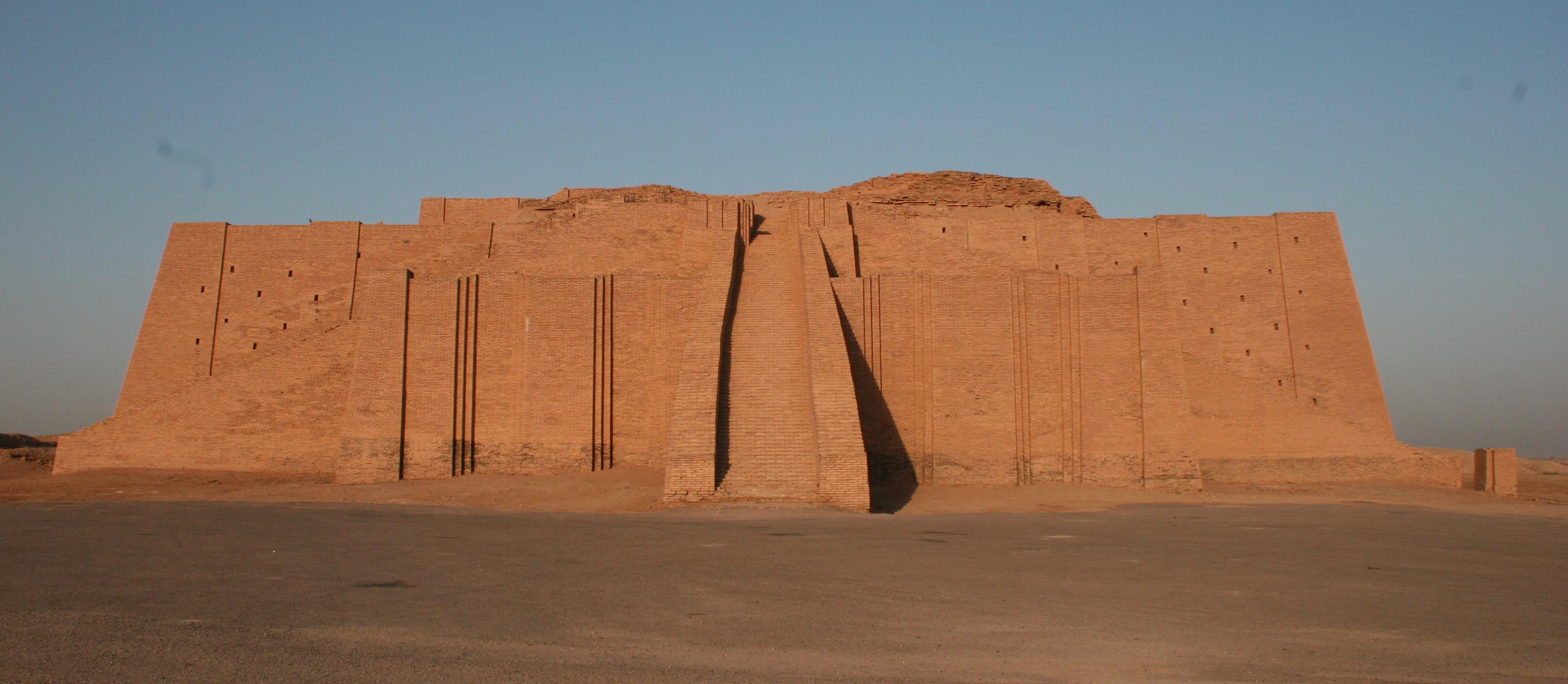
Ziggurat of Ur

The Renaissance of Sumer is a period of the history of Mesopotamia that includes the years between the fall of the Akkadian Empire and the period of the Amorite dynasties of Isin and Larsa—both with governments of Semitic origin—between the centuries 22nd B.C. and 21st B.C. Within this stage the years of the so-called Third Dynasty of Ur or "Ur III" stand out, because of the new hegemony that would embrace all Mesopotamia, this time with the city of Ur at the head.

== Sumer survives the Gutian invasion ==
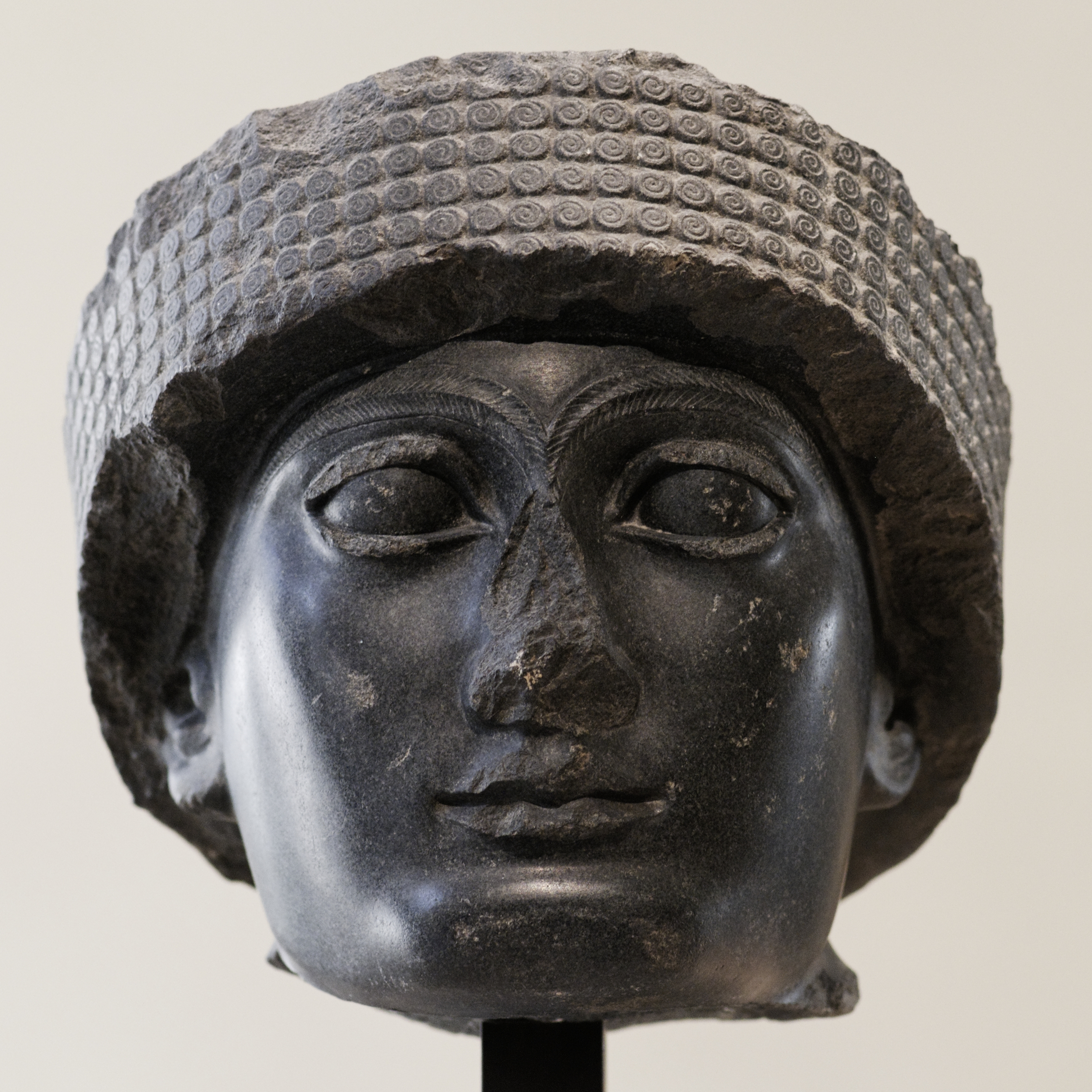
Figure of Gudea, patesi or governor of Lagash, in the Louvre Museum. The figure is made of diorite, a hard material that the cities imported from the Indus Valley, located about 2,000 km east of Mesopotamia.

Despite the irruption of the nomadic gutians, who provoked continuous plundering, razed cities and fields, and made trade difficult, the end of the Akkadian Empire did not bring decadence, at least in the southern part of Mesopotamia. The various cities were organized into small kingdoms. Akkad itself, the former imperial capital, maintained a small state in the territories near it, which survived for 30 years, until it was conquered by nomads. Subsequently, a hegemony of Uruk is assumed because it is so named in the Sumerian King List, but apart from the names in the list there is no further data to affirm or deny it.

== Lagash ==
Of this period, the best known history is that of Lagash: first the names of the ensi, vassals of the Sargonids of Akkad are known: Kikuid contemporary of Rimush, Engilsa contemporary of Manishtushu, Ura contemporary of Naram-Sin and Lugalshumgal contemporary of both Naram-Sin and Sharkalisharri. Later, it is known of a series of governors who could have been subordinate to Uruk: Puzurmama, Urutu, Urmama, Lubau, Lugula and Kaku. After them, the city achieves hegemony in the region, in what is called Second Dynasty of Lagash: Urbaba, Gudea, Urningirsu, Pirigme, Urgar and Mammakhani; who represent a continued family succession (from father to son or father-in-law to son-in-law).

Urbaba (2164 B. C. to 2144 B. C.) was the first of the monarchs to exercise hegemony; his daughter Enanepeda was appointed priestess of the goddess Nannar in Ur, which may indicate that she dominated in this city. During Gudea's reign, Lagash's dominion over Nippur, Adab, Uruk and Badtibira is recorded.

Despite the fact that during his reign, Lagash made a conquering expedition over Elam, it is considered that Gudea was a relatively peaceful king, more interested in trade than in conquest. Thus, an inscription celebrates that he succeeded in reopening trade "from the upper sea to the lower sea" and is known to have maintained trade contacts with the timber areas of present day Syria and Lebanon; with Magan, in present day Oman, and with the Indus Valley, from which diorite, copper and gold were obtained. All these materials were used in the elaborate sculpture characteristic of this period, most notably the numerous figures of the monarch. These sculptures were specially designed to decorate the temples, which underwent major reconstructions during the reign of Gudea. Of these constructions, the temples of Ningirsu (whose ruins were lost in the first excavations) and Nanshe, which, according to an inscription, Gudea undertook after a divine apparition in a dream, stand out. Prosperity continued with the kings Urningirsu and Pirigme.

== Third dynasty of Ur ==
During the later period it was Uruk, with the reign of Utu-hegal who gained a predominant position. The new monarch defeated the chief of the nomadic gutians, Tiriqan, who was taken prisoner, after which he appointed himself "king of the four regions". Utu-hegal was succeeded by Ur-Nammu, who it is not known whether he belonged to his dynasty or was a usurper. It has been speculated that it could be his brother. The new king strove to realize the title he had inherited; he attacked neighboring cities and conquered Nippur, Uruk, Larsa, Ur, Eridu and Lagash, whose king Nammahni was killed. After this, he decided to move the capital of his state from Uruk to Ur, founding a new dynasty; the III dynasty of Ur. The reason for this move is unclear, although it is possible that Ur-Nammu had been governor of this city before receiving the throne of Uruk.

Extension of the empire of the Third Dynasty of Ur (the north is located on the right)

- Ur-Nammu gave himself the title of "king of Sumer and Akkad", although the limits of his domains are not precisely known. His inscriptions have been found in numerous Sumerian cities—Nippur, Lagash, Uruk, Larsa, Eridu and Ur—and even in the upper reaches of the Diyala River, but none in Akkad, so it is possible that the title was more honorific than real. During his reign reforms were carried out: the so-called code of Ur-Nammu was written, jurisprudence was unified, the equivalence between the different existing currencies was fixed, canals were opened, and temples were rebuilt.
- His son and successor Shulgi, consolidated the kingdom during his 48 years of rule. The first 23 years of his reign he focused on administrative tasks: he introduced as a volume measure the gur (200 liters), rebuilt numerous temples, reformed the army by creating a corps of archers and restored the city of Der, on the eastern borders of the empire. It was on this frontier that Shulgi would have to face the first conflicts. For four years he clashed with the semi-nomadic peoples inhabiting the Zagros Mountains south of the Lower Zab. Seeking Elam's support in the conflict, Shulgi married his daughter to the governor of Anshan. Diplomacy failed, and four years later the empire of Ur confronted Elam; winning after two years of war. A new period of nine years of peace followed the conflict, after which all the semi-nomadic peoples of the Zagros formed a coalition that attacked the empire again.
- It was the successor of Shulgi, Amar-Sin who managed to quell this new conflict. Among his actions was the conquest and destruction of Erbil—Urbilum in Sumerian—on the banks of the lower Zab. The rest of his reign was relatively peaceful, although the arrival of nomads from the Arabian Desert, who settled in the central area of Mesopotamia, or Akkad, increased.
- Thus, his successor Shu-sin (2036 B. C.-2028 B. C.) built a 270 km fortification system, called Martu wall, which was to stop the incursions of the Martu or Amorites and the Tidnum (or Ttidanum), another nomadic Semitic tribe.
- Ibbi-Sin, brother of Shu-sin was the last ruler of the dynasty. On the western frontier, the Amorites broke through the barriers by cutting off the roads to trade and ravaging the crops. This devastation caused famines in the central cities of the empire, leading to rebellions and the surrender of many of them. In this situation, Shu-sin left command of the border regions to an official named Ishbi-Erra, until then governor of Mari. After a defeat of the king against the Elamites, Ishbi-Erra himself rose up against the empire, founding a dynasty of his own in Isin, north of Ur. In 21st century B.C., Ur itself fell to the nomads of the Zagros, who razed the city, plundering the temples and destroying the houses.

== The Amorite dynasties ==
=== Isin ===
Isin and Babylon during the Kassites dynasty, 13th century B.C.

The empire of Ur was not succeeded by another state covering the whole of Mesopotamia. However, it does not seem that this was a period of chaos and social destruction. It was Ishbi-Erra, with his kingdom centered in Isin, who achieved the dominion of great part of the Sumerian cities, in a partial hegemony that would last half a century. In the early years of his reign he succeeded in disarming the bands of nomadic bandits that impeded trade with the regions further north, after which followed a period of peace that continued during the reign of his successors.

=== Larsa ===
Some Sumerian cities were not controlled by the Isin dynasty. From the reign of Lipit-Ishtar, one of them began to stand out: it was Larsa. The flourishing of Larsa became evident around the 20th century BC, when king Gungunum conquered Elam, the Diyala valley and, finally, the ancient city of Assur. About five years later, after conquering the city of Ur, Gungunum named himself "king of Sumer and Akkad". His successor Abisare continued the expansion of the kingdom, conquering the Akkadian cities of Kish and Akusum as well as Nippur. As early as the 19th century B.C., King Bur-Sin of Isin tried to check the advance of Larsa by conquering Ur and Nippur, but his initiative must have failed as by the middle of the century, Isin had lost all territory beyond the city itself.

=== Babylon ===
During this first Larsa dynasty, a hitherto unimportant city, Babylon, founded a principality in the territory of Akkad, further north, which included the cities of Sippar, Dilbat and Kazallu. In the south, Larsa's control was not total either, and in the late 19th century B.C., during the reign of Rim-Sin I, a coalition of cities rose up against his power. Among the rebel cities were Uruk, Isin and also Babylon. The first two fell in the 19th and 18th centuries B.C. and 18th B.C. respectively. A new king, Hammurabi, came to the throne of Babylon while Rim-Sin was preparing for conquest. The new monarch not only prevented Rim-Sin's plans, but defeated him completely, after which he would undertake the conquest of practically the whole of Mesopotamia, forming the so-called Paleo-Babylonian Empire.

== Administration ==
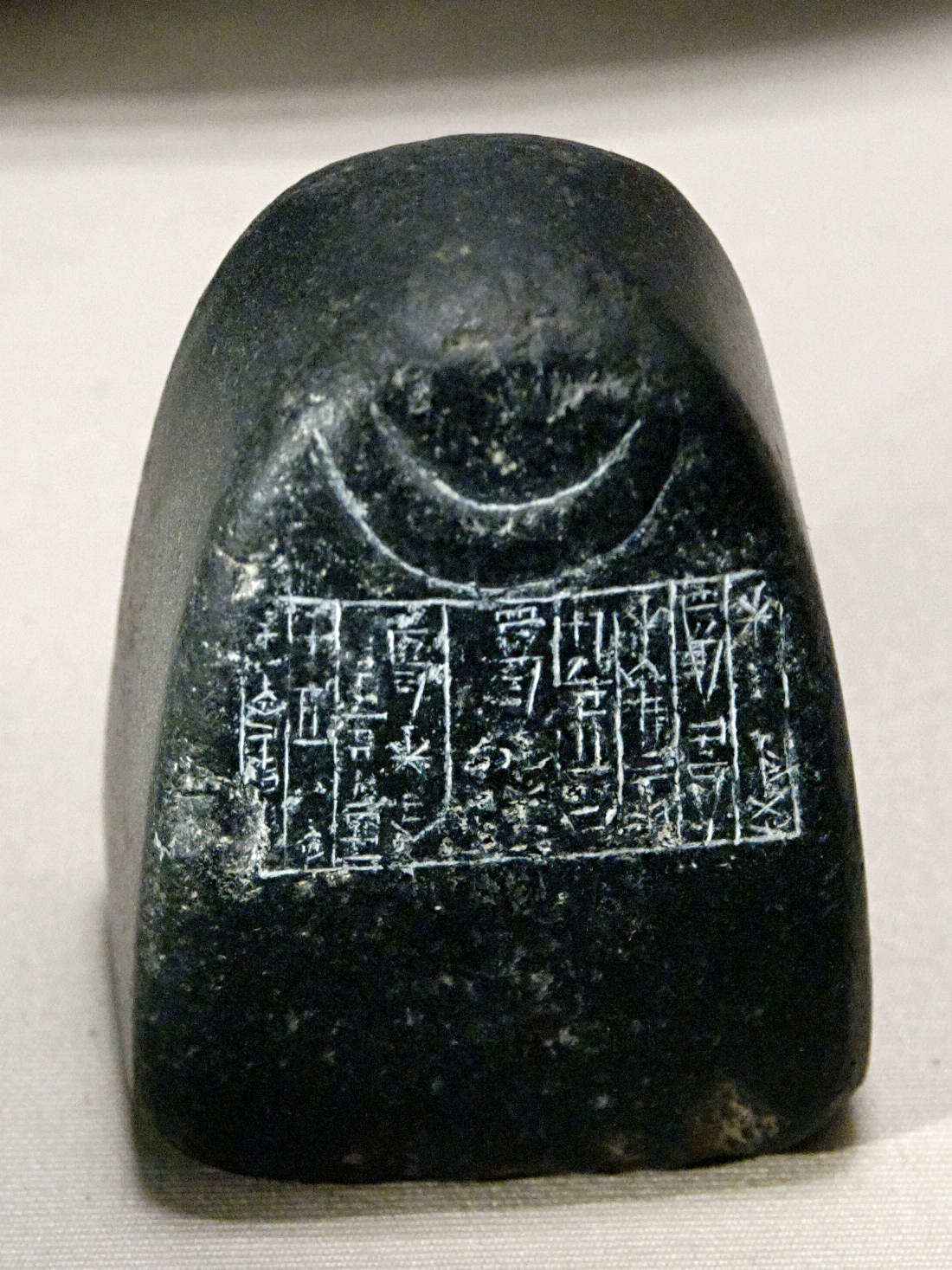
Reference weight of half a mina, a unit of measurement that was equivalent to 248 gram. It is signed by King Shulgi and bears the emblem of the moon god Nannar

During the Ur empire, an important bureaucracy was developed, as shown in the hundreds of thousands of tablets that have been found that reflect all kinds of activities: contracts, accounting, salaries, work schedules, provision bookings, tax records, etc. This administrative work was carried out by officials whose work was supervised by other higher ranking officials such as the aga-ush (police), nu-banda (inspector) or mashkim (commissioner). To unify the records of the different regions, a system of standard measurements was created and a new calendar was devised that defined each year with some important event happening in it.

The territory was divided into different regions in charge of which there was a military governor or shagin and a civil governor or ensi. The attributions of each varied according to the different circumscriptions but in general, the ensi was dedicated to tasks such as justice, temple offerings and the payment of salaries. In some border regions the shagin was also in charge of agricultural tasks and irrigation infrastructures.

Another important part of the state administration was the mail system, which had a complete system of postal sites and roads. Goods were transported by the sukkal, who were considered high-level officials and worked under the command of a sukkalmah, postmaster.

== Economy ==
Metal-producing regions used in Mesopotamia. Despite the fact that the region lacked metal deposits of its own, it was its inhabitants who, through trade, controlled this commodity.

Like the administration, the economy in the Ur period was strongly centralized. Agricultural production was largely controlled by the state, which reserved an important part of the production for the maintenance of the temples. Another part of this maintenance was the responsibility of the cities. To organize all the offerings, Shulgi ordered the construction of a large warehouse in Drehem, near Nippur.

Among the industrial and manufacturing activities, textile production stood out, which was mainly carried out by women. In general, the artisans belonged to the eren class, largely made up of war slaves. In the Ur period, a large part of these slaves were of elamite origin, given the numerous wars experienced between that people and the Sumerians. Although the eren had less legal freedom than other classes, their situation could improve according to their abilities.

Among the commercial activities was the import of metals, to which was added the trade of ivory, precious stones and woods. Most of these materials came from the Persian Gulf route, originating in Magan (in present-day Oman) and the Indus Valley. Copper was also obtained from the Anatolian peninsula and silver came from Elam.

The method of exchange was still based mainly on barter, in which Mesopotamia contributed goods such as cloth, wool or dates. However, the use of money also began to become popular during this period.

== Society ==
During the period of Ur III, to the social distinctions based on the legal rights of the citizen—which distinguished between slaves and free men—a new division was reaffirmed according to the economic status of each individual. Thus, among the free men a distinction was made between the mashda or later mushkenum and the rulers of society, while the lower class was not specifically that of the slaves but of the eren, made up of all kinds of workers who shared their low economic capacity. The eren may or may not have been slaves, but they still lacked many rights, such as the freedom to move about without permission from their overseer.

Slavery, however, was not necessarily associated with a humble way of life, since within the slaves were distinguished in turn several types. The ir or geme were engaged in domestic and service work, and their labor was generally no heavier than that of citizens with greater legal rights. Part of the members of this class came from poor families, having been given by their parents to ensure them a better economic situation.

Nonetheless, another group of slaves, called namra, suffered a more precarious situation. The namra were generally prisoners of war, and belonged entirely to the eren class. The tasks they performed, generally heavier than those of other groups, included the construction of infrastructure or even military tasks.

== See also ==
- Sumer
- Ur
- Mesopotamia
