= Centre for Medieval and Renaissance Studies =

Study Abroad program in Oxford, England

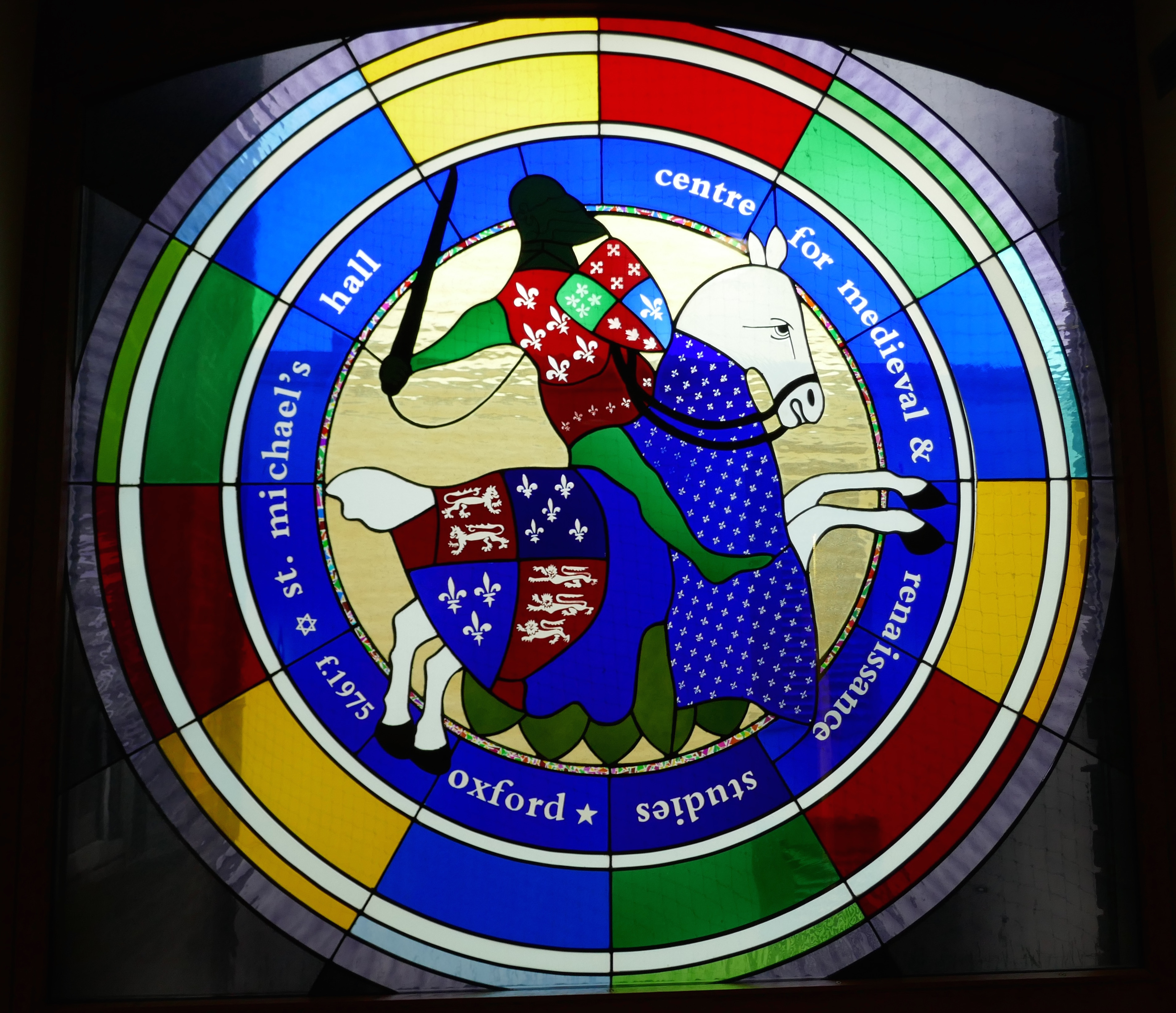
Logo of the Centre for Medieval and Renaissance Studies

The Middlebury College-CMRS Oxford Humanities Program (M-CMRS) in Oxford, England, is a programme for international students (mainly from liberal arts colleges in the US) to study in Oxford. It encourages research in the humanities and fields of Medieval and Renaissance studies.

M-CMRS is located in St. Michael's Hall on Shoe Lane, close to Carfax at the very center of Oxford. St Michael's Hall is a large building and contains a lecture hall, teaching rooms, offices for the M-CMRS administration, the Feneley Library (which includes over 17,000 volumes), and several floors of student accommodation, including a kitchen, dining room, and Junior Common Room.

M-CMRS has long been affiliated with Keble College, Oxford, and while M-CMRS students are not matriculated students of the University of Oxford, they are associate members of Keble College with access to all its facilities. Students are also able to access the Bodleian Libraries.

Eight weeks of each semester coincide with Oxford University's Michaelmas or Hilary Terms.

== History ==
The Centre for Medieval and Renaissance Studies, or CMRS, was founded by Dr. John and Dr. Sandra J.K.M Feneley in 1975. Together they designed everything from the academic programme to the student recruitment strategy. Sandra also curated the library, an impressive collection focusing on medieval and renaissance texts. Both John and Sandra loved cats, and their maine coons were often spotted around the library. Today, photos of the cats can still be found around the building.

Mr Alun Thornton Jones was among the first tutors hired by CMRS and eventually went on to become Dean. As well as being an expert in Classics, he was an extraordinary map-drawer and produced several maps for the Campaign to Protect Rural England and the Oxford Preservation Trust. His maps were hand drawn using a calligraphy pen. One of the seminar rooms in M-CMRS is dedicated to Mr Jones and the walls feature framed prints of his maps. In orientation week, new students are still given one of his hand drawn maps of central Oxford, with St Michael's Hall highlighted in the centre.

In 1986, CMRS became affiliated with Keble College so that students could access college facilities and join clubs and societies, giving them a richer experience of student life in Oxford.

In 2014, CMRS became part of the global network of Middlebury College C.V. Starr Schools Abroad and is now known as the Middlebury College-CMRS Oxford Humanities Program (M-CMRS). M-CMRS is supported by the educational charity Middlebury College UK Trust Ltd, which also supports the Bread Loaf School of English, hosted by Lincoln College in Oxford.

Among the American colleges and universities that have sent students to M-CMRS are The University of Georgia, Elmhurst College, St. Mary's College of California, St. Mary's College of Maryland, St. Olaf College, St. Cloud State University, William Jewell College, Amherst College, Manhattanville College, Oberlin College, and Campbell University.
