= St Jude's Church, Southsea =

Church in Southsea, Hampshire, England

Coordinates: 50°47′13″N 1°05′19″W

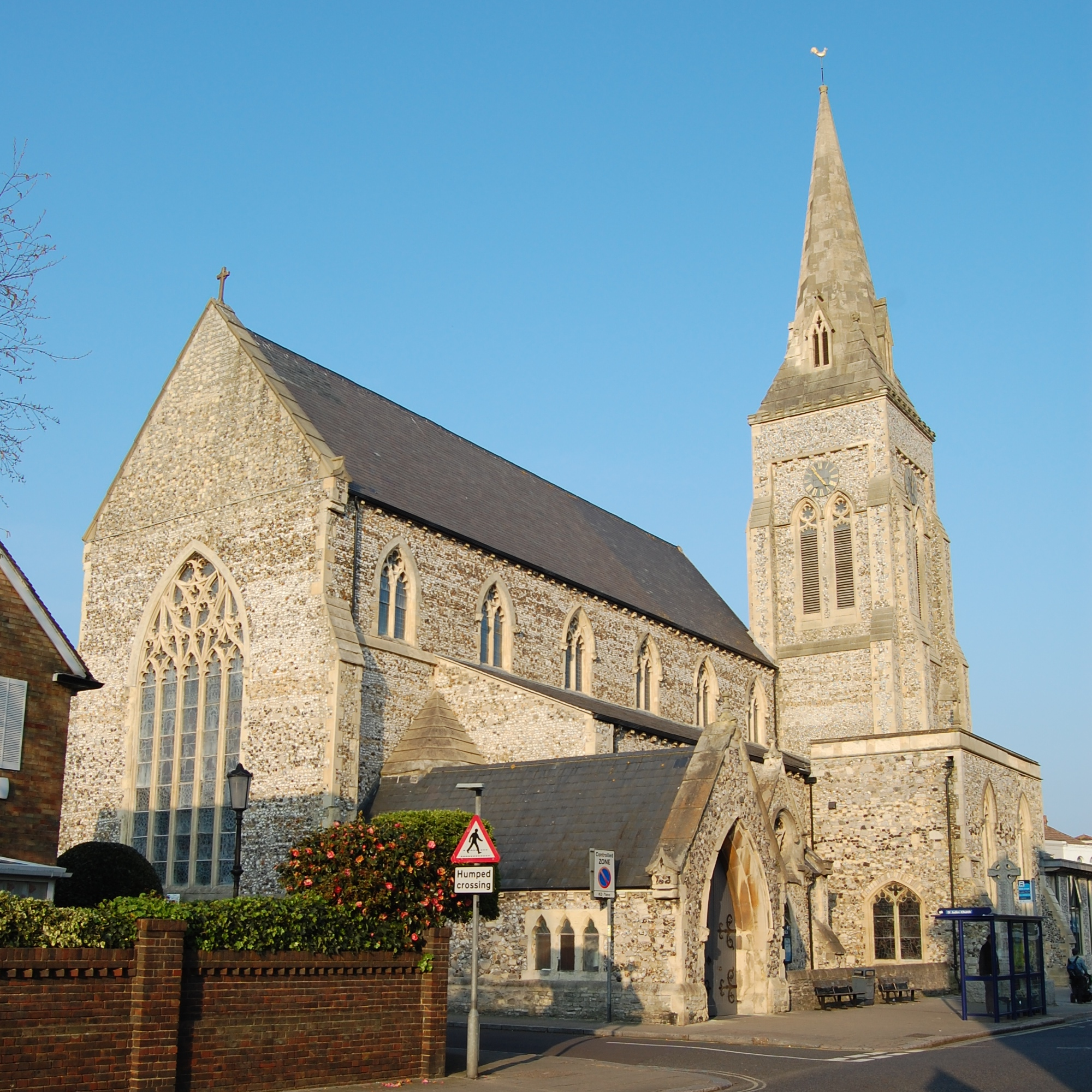

St Jude's Church, Southsea is a Church of England church in Southsea, Hampshire, built in 1851 by Thomas Ellis Owen as part of a housing development. It was listed Grade II on the National Heritage List for England in September 1972.
