= Thomas Ellis Owen =

English architect (1805–1862)

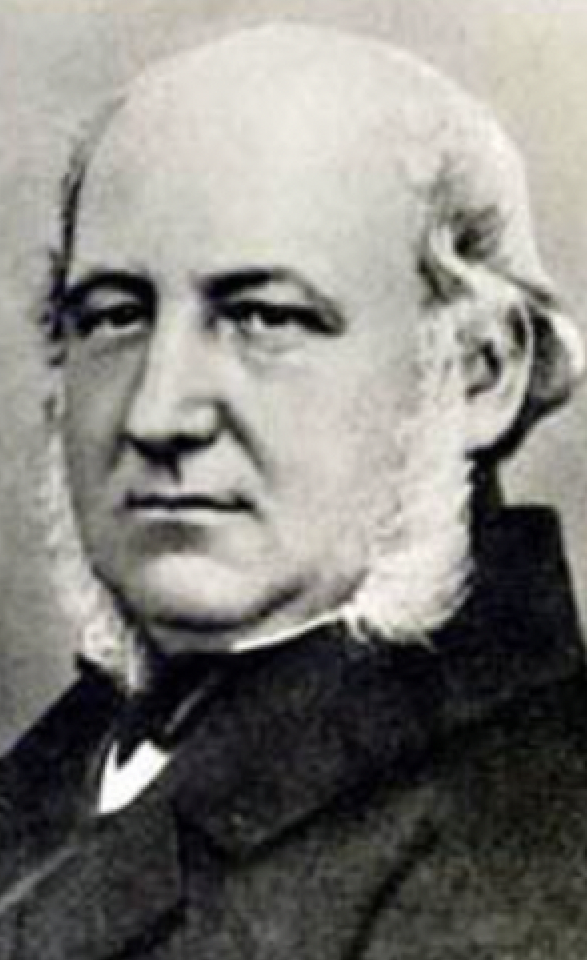
- Occupation: Architect
- Spouse: Catherine Higgins
- Parent: Jacob Owen (father)
- Buildings: St Jude's Church; Portland Terrace; Eastern Parade
- Projects: Portsea Island survey

Mayor of Portsmouth
- In office 1847–1848
- Preceded by: George John Scale
- Succeeded by: Benjamin Bramble
- In office 1862 (died in office)
- Preceded by: William Grant Chambers
- Succeeded by: William Humby

Personal details
- Born: 11 March 1805
- Died: 11 December 1862 (aged 57)

Thomas Ellis Owen (1805–1862) was an English architect and developer responsible for many of the buildings that still exist in Southsea and Gosport. He designed many churches in Hampshire and some of his work that still stands today can be found in Shropshire, Dorset and Pembrokeshire.

== Biography ==
=== Early life and training ===
Owen was born in Middlesex, the son of Mary and Jacob Owen, an architect for the Royal Engineers Ordnance Department in Portsmouth. He trained as an architect and, although his architecture was probably influenced by John Nash, Owen had a lighter touch that belonged more to his Georgian roots than the Victorian times he mainly practiced in. On completing his articles, Owen travelled through Italy studying its architectural history and development. Returning to England, Thomas married Catherine, the daughter of one of his father's colleagues J.W Higgins, surveyor of Government Works.

=== Early career ===
In the 1820s he entered into a private practice with his father, Messrs Jacob Owen and Son. Many of the ecclesiastical and civic works undertaken by the father and son is hard to clearly attribute to either one during this period, although it seems likely that there was a high degree of collaboration between them in buildings such as All Saint's Church, Portsea (1825-1828), Holy Trinity Church, Gosport (1828-30) and St John the Baptist, Rowlands Castle (1837). In the 1830s Owen, along with his father and father-in-law, began developing the land around Southsea as a business venture.

=== Development of Southsea ===
Owen was instrumental in shaping the development of Southsea during the middle part of the 19th century, developing it from poorly drained farmland into a garden suburb. He designed and built 106 villas and 54 terrace houses in Southsea, including Queens Terrace, Beach Road, Portland Terrace, and Eastern Parade. In addition, he designed a range of commercial, religious, and civic buildings, including St Jude's Church in central Southsea.

Owen's early developments began as an extension of the Dockyard Garrison, but soon drew the attention of the nobility and gentry of Portsea Island, who were attracted to the fashionable terraces which included Kings Terrace and Bellevue Terrace. In the early 1830s, Owen completed developments in the Grove Road and surrounding area, later extending towards the Kent Road area with Swiss Cottage (1837) and Queens Terrace (1837-40). Further works followed. Owen's works include Kent Road (Kent Lodge), Grove Road South (The Shrubbery), The Thicket (1844/6), Portland Terrace (1846), Queens Place (1847), Dovercourt (1848). In the 1850s he completed St Jude's Church (1851), Sussex Terrace (1854/5) and 30-34 Sussex Road (1857). Along with his father, Jacob Owen, and his brother Jeremiah Owen, he lent his entrepreneurial hand to infrastructural projects in the areas including gas supply, the Portsea Canal, railways, the Camber Docks and hospitals.

=== Politics and Portsmouth mayoralty ===
In addition to his work as an architect and developer, Owen was a prominent civic figure.Owen's politics, like that of his brother-in-law Sir Charles Lanyon were instinctively conservative. Historian Norman Gordon has noted that Owen's rise in Portsmouth politics was meteoric in comparison to other civic leaders in Portsmouth. Despite this, his first attempts to enter politics were unsuccessful. In 1835, Owen entered his name for election of the new Borough Council, perceiving a political biased because only Reform or Whig supporters were chosen. At the election the entire nine candidates of the 'Reform' group were elected. Owen came eleventh with 95 votes. Following the Alderman elections of 31 December 1835 a vacancy opened in St Thomas' Ward. Owen found himself facing off against Benjamin Bramble but lost by 177 votes to 111.

Despite these losses, Owen remained a keen political commentator in Portsmouth politics through his development work. He became Mayor of Portsmouth twice (in 1847 and 1862) and also served as a magistrate.

=== Memorials ===
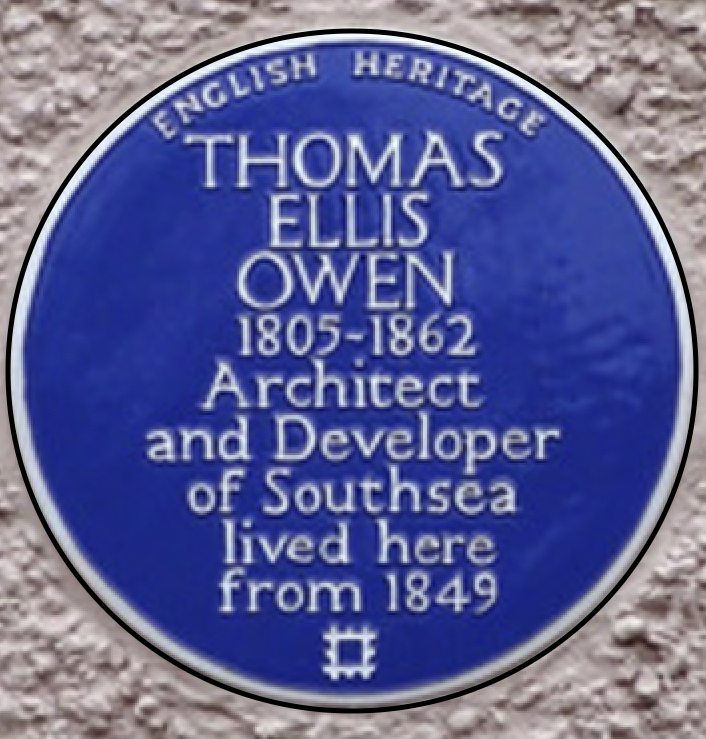
Thomas Ellis Owen English Heritage Plaque

In 2010 a statue of Owen was unveiled, located near the University Library, Cambridge Road, Portsmouth. An English Heritage Blue Plaque was placed at Dovercourt, 36 Kent Road, Southsea, Owen's former home, inscribed with 'Thomas Ellis Owen, 1805–1862, Architect and Developer of Southsea lived here from 1849'.

There is a pub named after him in Palmerston Road in Southsea.
