= Apkar Tebir =

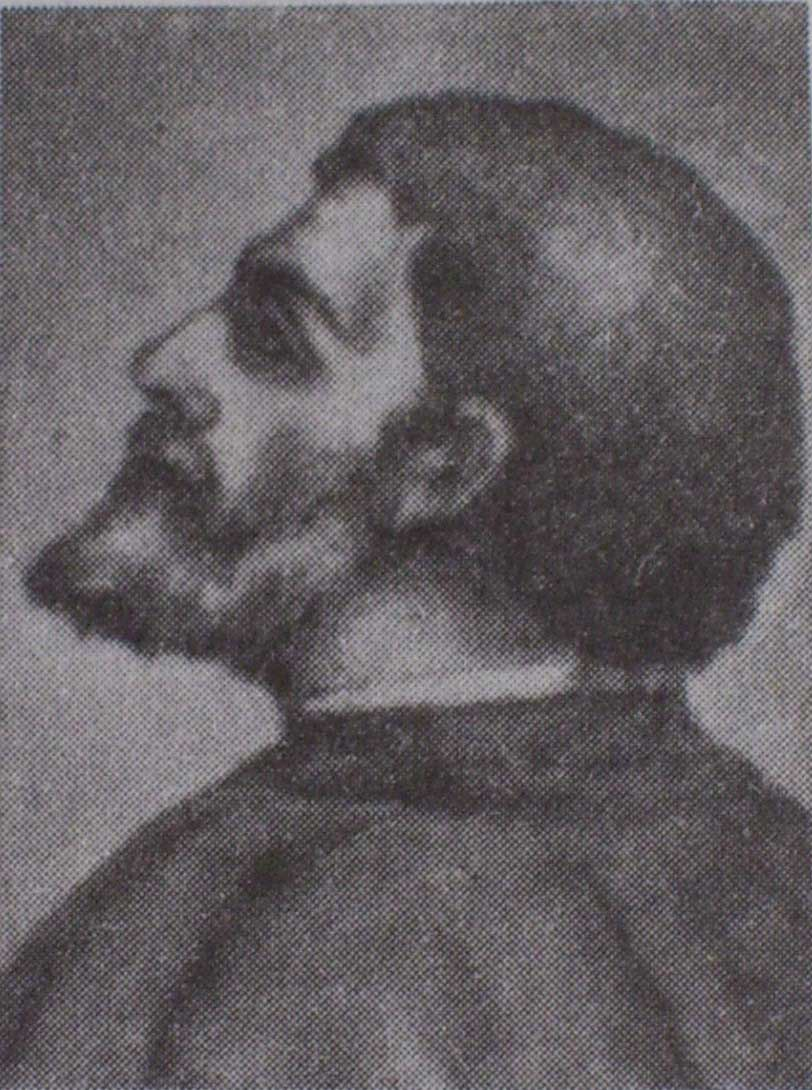
- Born: Tokat, Turkey
- Education: Knowledge of printing press
- Occupation: Colonist

Apkar Tebir was an Armenian colonist and priest. He was one of the first to set up a printing press in Constantinople.

== Life and influence ==
Apkar Tebir was born in Tokat, Turkey. He studied typography in Venice, and in 1567, set up a printing press in Constantinople, one of the first to do so. In 1627, he obtained a Greek printing press, built by Nicodemus Metaxas, which had its machinery and type imported from England.

This had an important effect on Turkish Armenia and the Mediterranean world. The most notable was that of cultural repair, mainly though the colonists' work to restore Armenia's heritage through the medium of the printed page.

These activities showed their readiness to join in the European Renaissance, and they quickly undertook the task of broadening their compatriots' knowledge of the West. The Armenians also lent assistance during the Crusades, which helped a warm relationship develop between the Gregorian and the Roman Catholic churches.

== See also ==
- Armenian Renaissance
