= John Addenbrooke (philanthropist) =

English doctor and benefactor

- Born: 1680; Staffordshire
- Died: June 7, 1719 (aged 38–39); Buntingford, Hertfordshire
- Education: St Catharine's College, Cambridge
- Known for: Addenbrooke Hospital

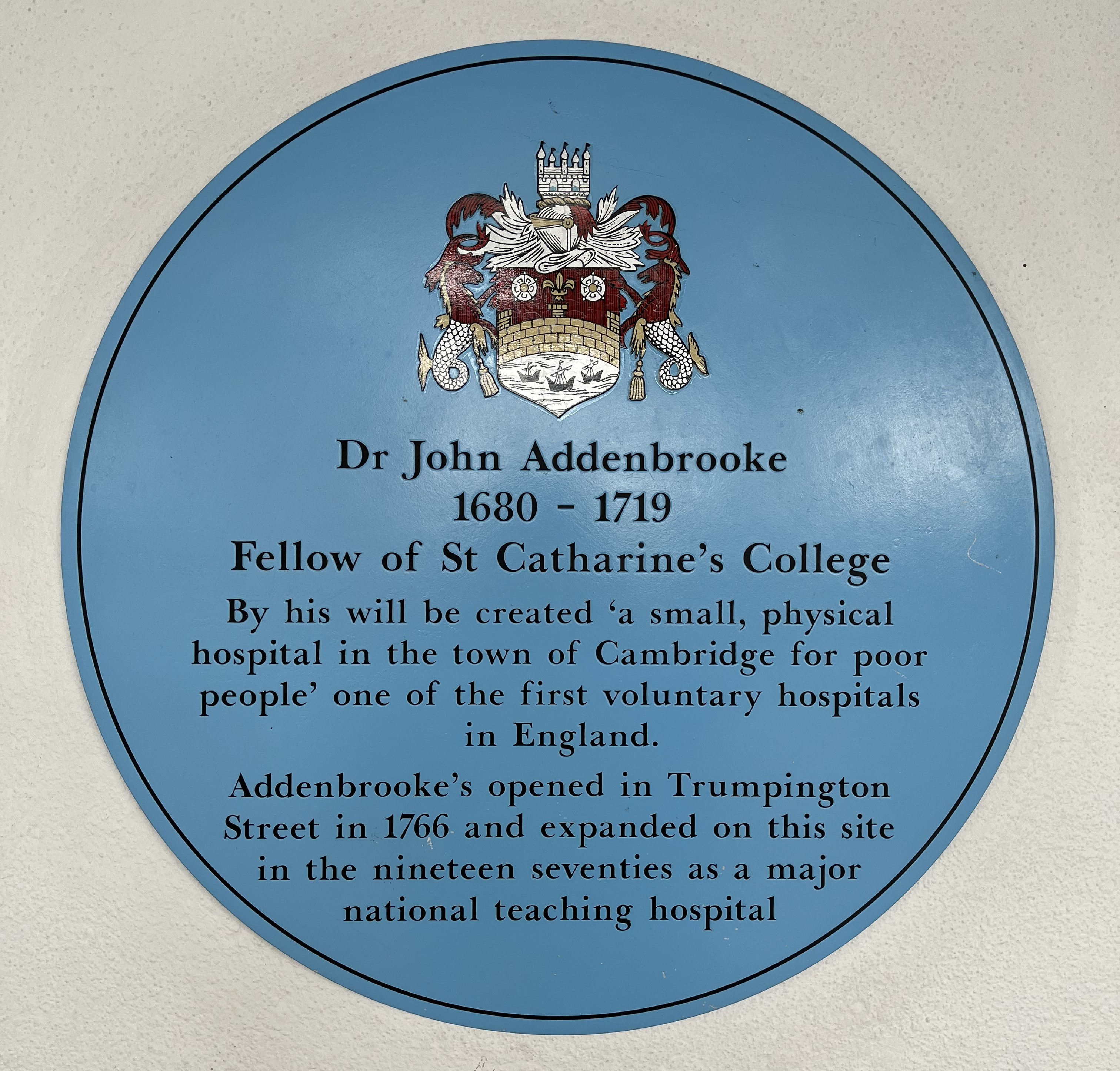
Dr John Addenbrooke - Blue plaque - Addenbrooke's Hospital

John Addenbrooke (1680 – 7 June 1719) was an English medical doctor and philanthropist, who left more than £4,500 (equivalent to about £876,979 in 2025) in his will for the founding of a hospital for the poor. Addenbrooke's Hospital, which has expanded significantly since its beginnings, is now a major teaching hospital in Cambridge, England.

Addenbrooke studied at Catharine Hall, now St Catharine's College, a part of the University of Cambridge. He was later a fellow and bursar there, and bequeathed a collection of rare medical books to the college library.

== Life ==
John Addenbrooke was born in 1680 in Staffordshire, England, enrolling in Catharine Hall on December 13, 1697.

In 1711, he left Cambridge to practice medicine near London.

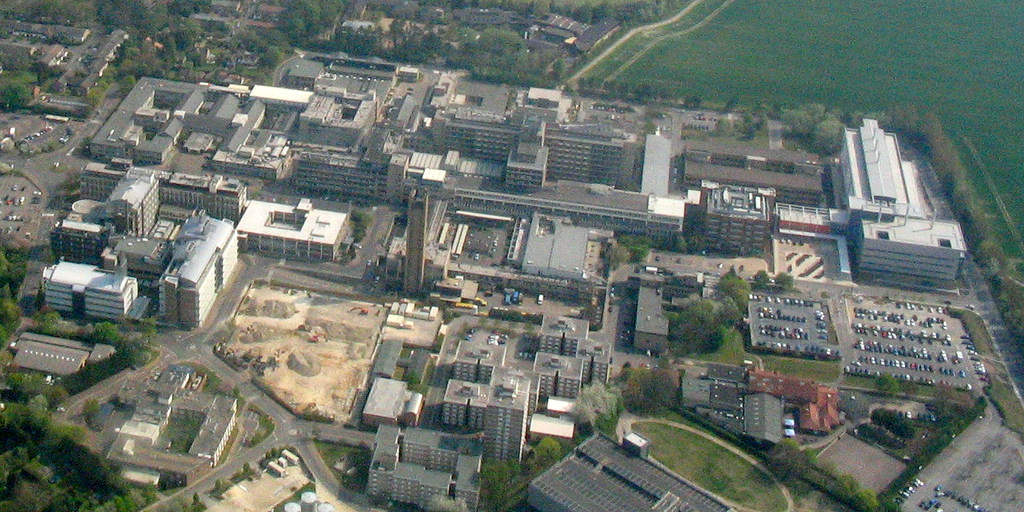
Aerial view of Addenbrooke's Hospital before 2010

On June 7, 1719, John Addenbrooke died, leaving £4,500 (equivalent to about £876,979 in 2025) to help erect a hospital in Cambridge.
