= Armenian Renaissance =

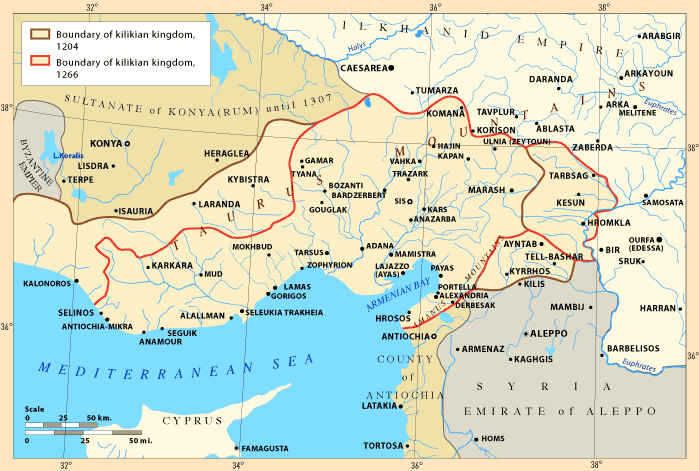
The Kingdom of Cilician Armenia, 1199-1375.

The Armenian Renaissance was roughly from the Crusades to the present day. The changing of the Armenian language and the rise of Armenian literature in the nineteenth century played a big part. The Renaissance in Armenia was very similar to that in Europe.

In this time when Europe was "being flooded with the light of New learning" Armenia was in the darkest age of its history. A third factor which accounts for the Armenian renaissance was the rediscovery of the Armenian classical literature.

== History ==
During the second half of the eleventh century certain "Turanian" tribes appeared on the horizon of western Asia. The invasion by Tartars and Mongols in the following two centuries laid waste the whole of Asia minor. Armenia was devastated by these onslaughts the loss of Armenia's political independence, and her culture life collapsed.

The Kingdom of Lesser Armenia, which made notable progress regeneration in Cilicia, did not fare much better at the hands of the Mamelukes of Egypt.

After the collapse of the last dynasty in Major Armenia in 1064, a large number of Armenians moved to Poland.

The future of Armenia laid on these colonists. In 1240 the first Armenian Church was erected at Rome, and 1434 the date of the founding of the Holy Cross at Venice, no fewer than eleven Armenian churches were built in Italy alone.

== See also ==
- Apkar Tebir
- Armenian Kingdom of Cilicia
