= Italian Renaissance interior design =

Italian Renaissance interior design refers to interior decorations, furnishings and the decorative arts in Italy during the Italian Renaissance period (c. mid-14th century – late-16th century).

== History, background and influences ==
Italy, in particular Florence and Tuscany, was the founding nation of the Renaissance artistic, cultural and social movement which swept across Europe and revolutionized European thought and philosophy. The Renaissance ended the Middle Ages and began a period of intensive learning, cultural appreciation and thought which still influences modern politics and society (Renaissance philosophy was mainly inspired by that of Ancient Rome and Ancient Greece). Along with this new movement, a whole new set of architectural principles were put in place, and the old Medieval and Gothic styles were neglected, and Classical designs were preferred. Cities such as Florence, and later Rome, Venice, Vicenza, Padua, Verona, Pienza, Naples, Turin, Milan and Siena began to be influenced by these new styles, often constructing elegant piazzas, beautiful palaces and re-designing some of the cluttered urban arrangements of the Middle Ages.

The architectural aim of the 15th and 16th centuries was to construct an ideal city, an urban settlement which was perfectly symmetrical, proportioned, spacious, elegant, grand and beautiful. No city in Italy truly reached this state, but many, such as Florence, Vicenza, Pienza and Rome became very similar, and were geometric and planned, full of palazzi and gardens. Scientific thought was also highlighted in the Renaissance, with new scientists such as Galileo Galilei, and the first ever female doctorate, Elena Piscopia (who graduated at the University of Padua). At the same time of this period of urbanisation and artistic thought, interior design was heavily affected too, changing nearly completely from that of the Middle Ages. The sumptuous palazzi of noblemen and the middle-classes began to be decorated with tapestries, sculptures, frescos and lavish furniture. The most powerful Italian families of the time, such as the Florentine Medici, the Roman Farnese, the Milanese Sforza, the Italo-Spanish Borgia and the Urbinese Montefeltro had their palaces decorated with grand marble sculptures and beautiful paintings, representing wealth, power and prestige.

== Furniture ==
=== (Marriage) Chests ===
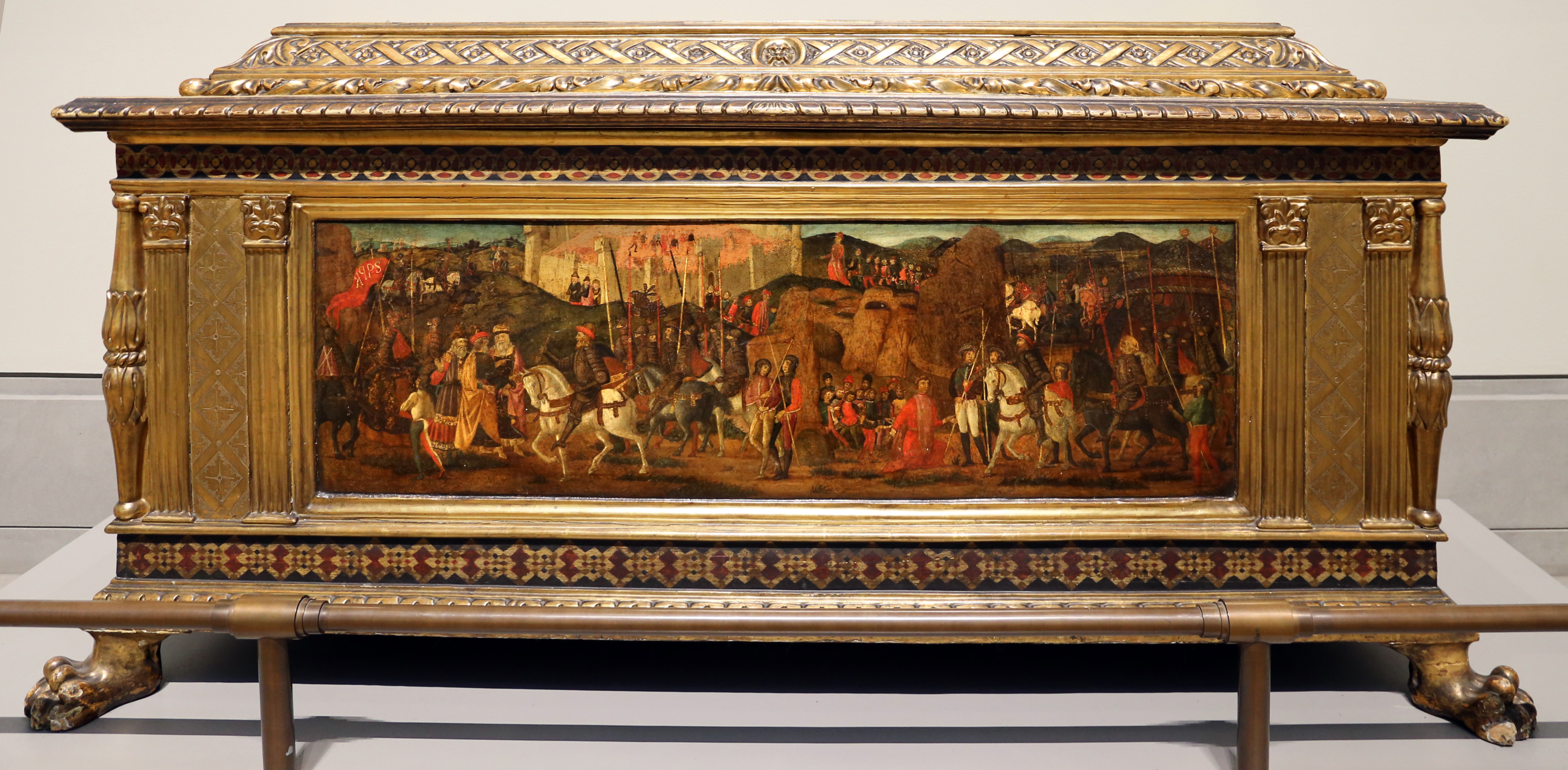
Cassone from the 15th century

Large cassoni (singular cassone) or marriage chests, were the most desired and common features of homes, and despite the fact that they were expensive, were bought by nearly all the social classes. Made with gesso and wood, these chests were often dark and elaborate, and their grandness depended on people's different classes (wealthier people had more sumptuous ones, whilst poorer classes' chests were often far simpler). The best decorators and sculptors in Italy often produced grand and beautiful chests for some of the most important noble families of the time. Even though these chests were used to put objects inside of them, many were used simply for decoration.

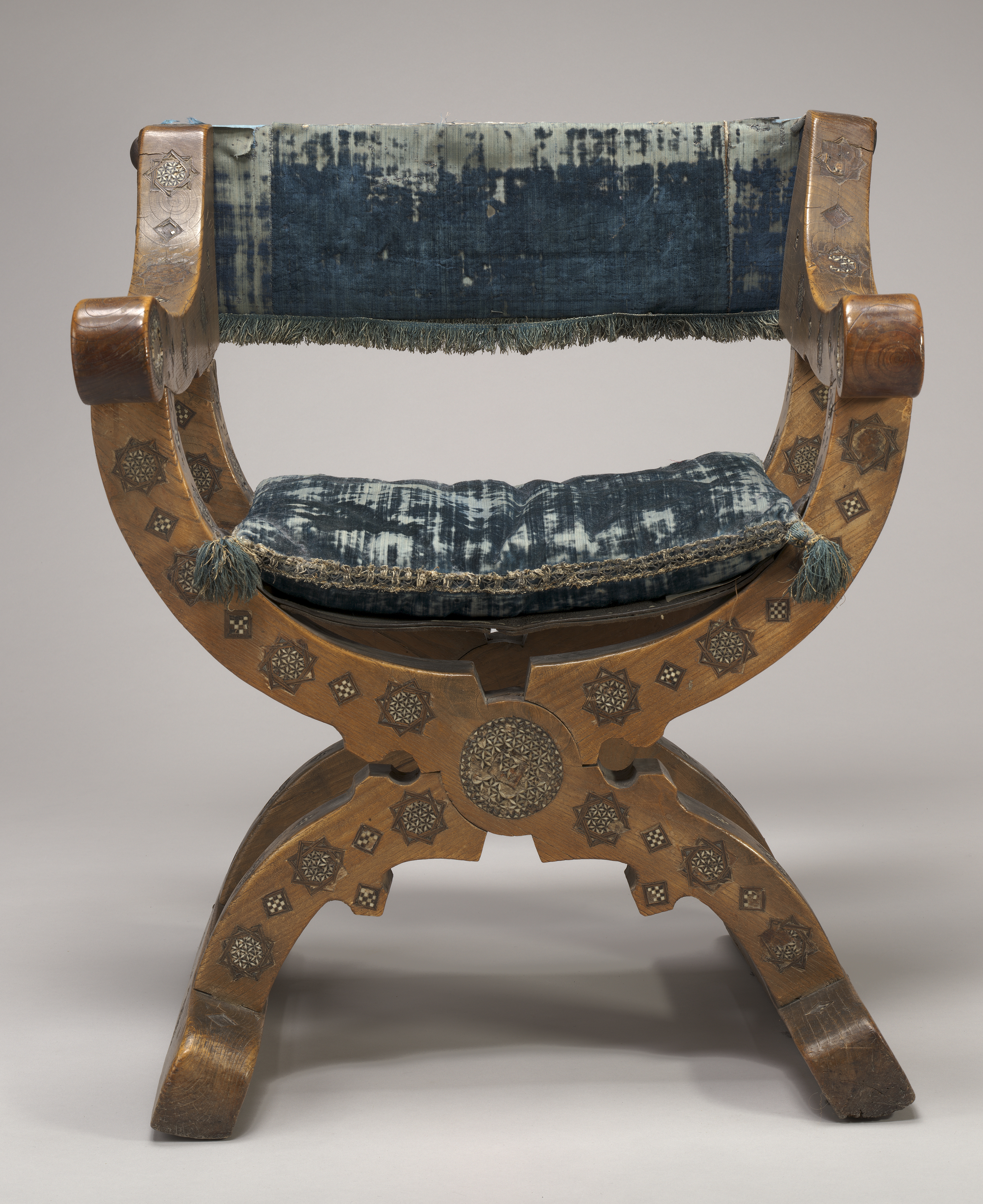
Chair with velvet upholstery and bone, horn, and boxwood inlay

=== Furniture and decorative work ===
Furniture was mainly made out of wood, often walnut or willow, and was usually rich in style, with many inlays of ivory, gold, stone, marble or other precious materials, often decorated with marquetry. Much furniture was also relatively grotesque (a French variation of the Italian word grottesco), often creating sculpted odd-looking gargoyles and monsters to make these items seem more amusing. Caryatids became popular at the time, and were made out of marble (the rich people used them as legs to their dining tables). Chairs such as the sgabello were considered symbols of wealth, and the wealthiest families had them made very sumptuous and grand. Poorer people's chairs had x-shaped backs, and some could only afford plain three-legged stools.

== Palladianism ==
Andrea Palladio always designed his villas with reference to their setting. If on a hill, such as Villa Capra, facades were frequently designed to be of equal value so that occupants could have fine views in all directions. Also, in such cases, porticos were built on all sides so that occupants could fully appreciate the countryside while being protected from the sun, similar to many American-style porches of today. Palladio sometimes used a loggia as an alternative to the portico. This can most simply be described as a recessed portico, or an internal single storey room, with pierced walls that are open to the elements. Occasionally a loggia would be placed at second floor level over the top of a loggia below, creating what was known as a double loggia. Loggias were sometimes given significance in a facade by being surmounted by a pediment. Villa Godi has as its focal point a loggia rather than a portico, plus loggias terminating each end of the main building.

== Bibliography ==
- Miller, Judith (2005). Furniture: world styles from classical to contemporary. DK Publishing. ISBN 0-7566-1340-X.
