= Shagin Law Group =

- Headquarters: Harrisburg, Pennsylvania
- Major practice areas: Immigration; International law
- Date founded: 1996
- Founder: Craig Shagin; Tim Anstine
- Company type: Limited liability company
- Website: www.shaginlaw.com

Shagin Law Group is a law firm headquartered in Harrisburg, Pennsylvania. Founded in 1996 as Shagin and Anstine the firm practices a wide variety of legal disciplines but specializes in the fields of immigration and international law.

== Notable publications ==
Deporting Private Ryan: The Less Than Honorable Condition of the Noncitizen in the United States Armed Forces

Preparing for a Spousal Adjustment Interview
