= Isaac Watts (naval architect) =

British naval architect (1797–1876)

Isaac Watts (1797–1876) was an early British naval architect. Together with Chief Engineer Thomas Lloyd, he designed HMS Warrior, the world's first armour-plated iron-hulled warship. When he retired his position as Chief Constructor was taken by Edward Reed.

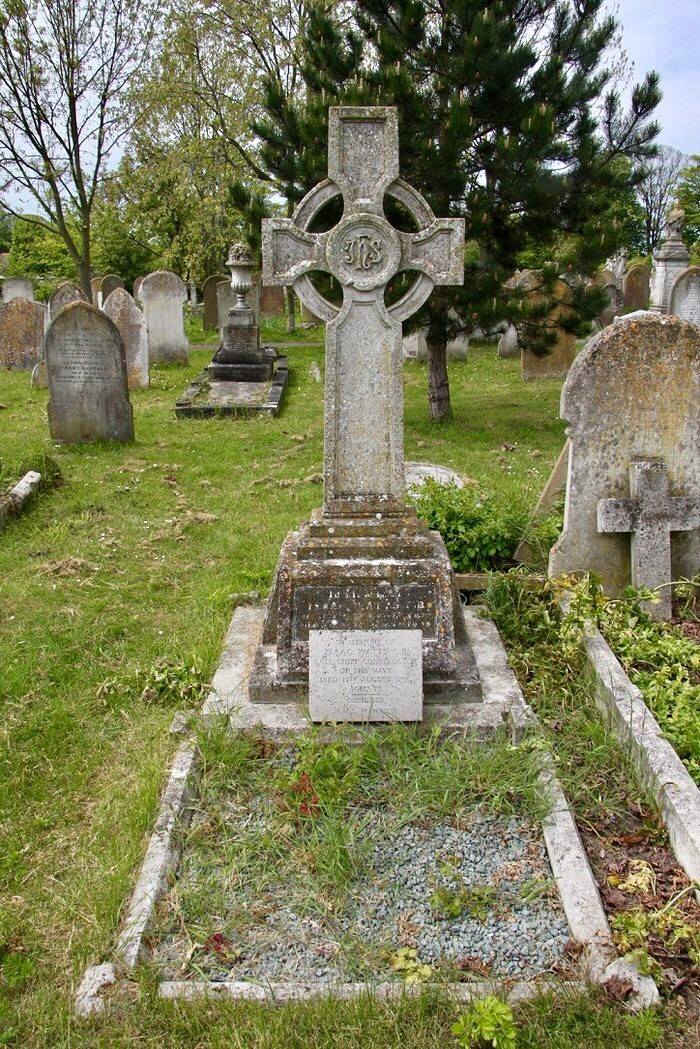
The grave of Isaac Watts in the churchyard of St Peter's, Kent
