= Libraries in the Medieval and Renaissance Periods =

1894 published work by John Willis Clark

Libraries in the Medieval and Renaissance Periods was the Rede Lecture of 1894, given by John Willis Clark. It was published as a book later in the same year.

The lecture was delivered at the University of Cambridge on 13 June 1894. It was reported in The Times on the day following with mention of the use of lantern slides. It covered what it refers to the libraries of the Ancient Romans as being the precursors for the libraries of the Middle Ages and Renaissance period. Then stepping through the publication of the rule of St. Benedict, early in the sixth century, that by the end of the 11th century that Benedictine houses possessed two sets of books—(1) distributed among the brethren; (2) that were kept in some safe place, and recounts that the Durham Rites spoke of book-presses standing in the cloister against the walls. Then by the beginning of the 15th century the larger monasteries at least had accumulated many hundred volumes as the number of the books had naturally increased.

With the development of the two universities in England, also came the development of their libraries, with the statues of the time affecting the libraries showing in the codes that the provisions imposed upon the colleges of Oxford and Cambridge were borrowed directly from the monastic customs. Though the universities at those times used to chain the works to the shelves, with a length of chain that would stretch to a nearby desk, and with this practice existing through the 16th and 17th century. The practice of chaining books diminished with the increasing number of available works with the development of printing. Then how these factors affected the design and use of libraries of the period/

The later published work was approximately 60 pages in length, and contained both engravings and, then, contemporary photographs of various libraries and features of libraries.
