= Renaissance studies =

Renaissance studies (also Renaissance and Early Modern Studies) is the interdisciplinary study of the Renaissance and early modern period. The field of study often incorporates knowledge from history, art history, literature, music, architecture, history of science, philosophy, classics, and medieval studies.

Renaissance studies programs exist at several universities, either as an independent field of study or as a subset of medieval studies, including the UCLA Center for Medieval and Renaissance Studies at University of California, Los Angeles.

== See also ==
- Medieval studies
