= Augustin Francis Bullock Creuze =

British naval architect

Augustin Francis Bullock Creuze FRS
- Born: 1800
- Died: 23 November 1852 (aged 51–52)
- Education: Royal Naval College, Portsmouth
- Occupation: Naval Architect
- Office: Principal Shipwright Surveyor

Augustin Francis Bullock Creuze (1800–1852) (AFB) was a nineteenth century naval architect with a flair for poetry.

== Biography ==
AFB was born in 1800, the first of five siblings. His father, Jacques Augustine, was a merchant based in London, having emigrated from France and subsequently, aged 40, married Hanah Myles Browne in 1797. In 1808 Jacques took a position as French Master at the Royal Naval College, Portsmouth and the family relocated to Portsea. Probably because of his father's position, AFB was admitted as an Officer Cadet to the Royal Naval College in 1817.

AFB Creuze became a noted figure in shipbuilding and promoted by the British Navy Board to Surveyor in 1831. His "Treatise On The Theory And Practice Of Naval Architecture" was published in several places including the Encyclopædia Britannica, and he became editor of Naval Science. He became admitted as a fellow of the Royal Society in 1842, and also became founding member of the first Royal School of Naval Architecture.

In 1844 he took employment with Lloyds Register in 1844 as Principle Shipwright Surveyor. At the Great Exhibition of 1851 he was one of the judges for the improvement of naval architecture.

AFB Creuze died in 1852 aged about 52. He bequested his collection of books to Lloyds Register which led to the formation of their library and archive. Lloyds renamed their marine training room at their "Augustin FB Creuze" as a recognition.

== Bibliography ==
- Treatise On The Theory And Practice Of Naval Architecture. A. & C. Black. 1841. OL 20556749M.
