= Royal School of Naval Architecture =

Coordinates: 51.484°N 0.005°W

- Active: 1864-
- Country: United Kingdom
- Branch: Royal Navy
- Type: Training
- Role: Naval architecture
- Garrison/HQ: South Kensington, Greenwich

The first School of Naval Architecture opened in 1811 in Portsmouth. The school was principally established to offer a deeper study of the principles of ship design than had traditionally been retained through the apprenticeship model. To this end, students were taught mathematics, science, drawing, history, geography and literature. In 1816, it joined the Royal Naval College at Portsmouth to become the Royal Naval College and the School for Naval Architecture. Political lobbying forced its closure in 1837. Divisions within the Navy had long been felt between those who saw educational pathways as key to progression within the Royal Navy and those who regarded family connections and patronage as the best means of advancement. Of the first School's closure, Reverend Joseph Woolley observed "that establishment produced men of accomplished skill and power in the application of sound theoretical principals to their professional work; but because they were treated with suspicion and dislike by the uneducated members of the profession, who unfortunately had too much influence at head quarters: the old cry of want of experience was raised against them, and the value of their services, were for many years--the best years of their lives--lost to the country."

This position changed shortly after Woolley made his remarks in March 1862, when in 1864, the Royal School of Naval Architecture or Royal School of Naval Architecture and Marine Engineering was founded in South Kensington to train naval architects. It was founded by Woolley, who had been Principal of the short-lived School of Mathematics and Naval Construction in Portsmouth (1848–1853). In 1873 the School moved to the Royal Naval College, Greenwich, then in 1967 to University College London. Many of its graduates entered the Royal Corps of Naval Constructors.

The title FRSNA is an abbreviation for Fellow of the Royal School of Naval Architecture.
