= Ballo =

Dance form in 15th century Italy

The ballo is an Italian Renaissance dance form that was practiced during the fifteenth century, most noted for its frequent changes of tempo and meter. The name ballo has its origin in Latin ballō, ballāre, meaning "to dance", which in turn comes from the Greek "βαλλίζω" (ballizō), "to dance, to jump about". In Greece there is the Greek dance named Ballos.

== Renaissance ==
During the Quattrocento balli were written by various composers, primarily the dance masters Domenico da Piacenza and Guglielmo Ebreo da Pesaro, who also wrote treatises including choreographies to their works.

Domenico wrote of the balli as dealing with four misure:

- The bassadanza, from the basse danse, consisting of what would now be labeled as a slow 6/4 or 3/2
- The quadernaria, one-sixth faster than the Bassadanza
- The saltarello, two-sixths faster than the Bassadanza
- The piva, twice as fast as the Bassadanza

== Baroque ==
The Renaissance dance should be distinguished from the early Baroque ballo, which was enlarged to include vocal numbers by such composers as Monteverdi (Il ballo delle ingrate), and Francesco Lambardi (Una festa a ballo). Handel included a ballo for two recorders and violin in the 1734 version of Il pastor fido (Handel)

== See also ==
- Ballata
