= Piva (dance) =

Italian Renaissance dance

Piva is an Italian Renaissance dance that may have originated from a peasant dance to the accompaniment of bagpipes. In 15th-century sources it is described as the fastest version of the basse danse. Antonio Cornazzano, for example, in his Libro del'arte del danzare (ca. 1455), explains that the music for the piva was also called cacciata, was in quadruple time beginning on the downbeat and was twice as fast as music for the basse danse.

== History ==
The term appeared also in the 16th century, applied to compositions for lute. The pivas in Joan Ambrosio Dalza's 1508 lute collection are very repetitive pieces in quick triple time, with no clearly defined structure. However, it may not be accurate to describe them as being in triple time, since the fast triple rhythmic groupings do not represent one bar each, but rather single beats divided into triplets, just like Thoinot Arbeau's mesure ternaire for the basse danse.
