= Galliard =

Form of Renaissance dance

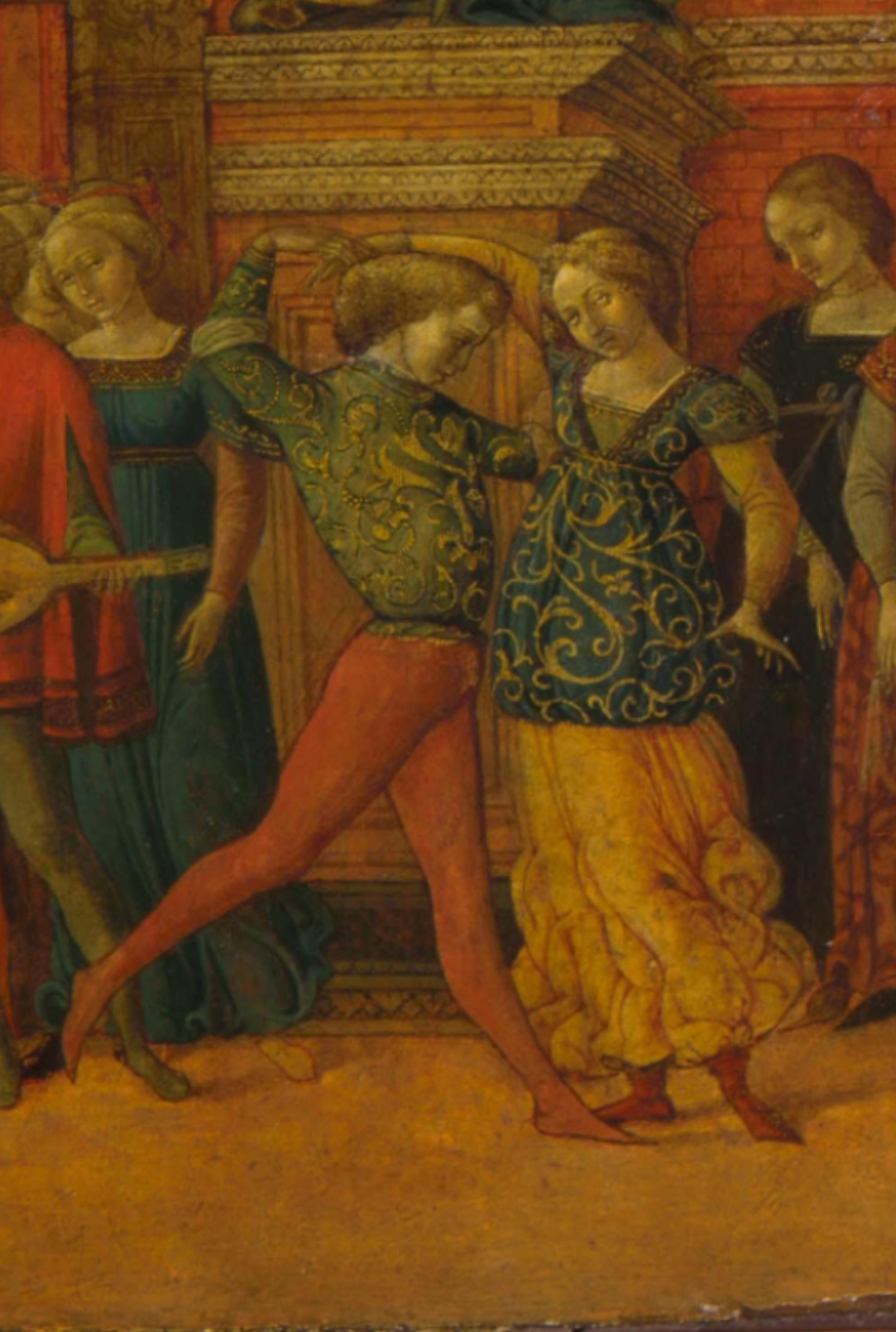
Galliard in Siena, Italy, 15th century

The galliard (/ˈɡæljərd/; French: gaillarde; Italian: gagliarda) is a form of Renaissance dance and music popular all over Europe in the 16th century. It is mentioned in dance manuals from England, Portugal, France, Spain, Germany, and Italy.

== Dance form ==
The galliard is not an improvised dance, but rather, it consists of choreographed patterns of steps, which occupy one or more measures of music. In one measure, a galliard typically has five steps; in French, such a basic step is called a cinq pas and in Italy, cinque passi. This is sometimes written in English sources as sinkapace. These steps are: right, left, right, left, cadence.

The galliard is an athletic dance, characterised by leaps, jumps, hops and other similar figures. The main feature that defines a galliard step is a large jump, after which the dancer lands with one leg ahead of the other. This jump is called a cadence, and the final landing is called the posture. The cadence is typically preceded by three quick hops with alternating feet. The sources generally describe movement patterns starting on the left foot, then repeating it starting with the right foot. A galliard pattern may also last twice as long, or more, which would involve 11 steps or 17 steps.

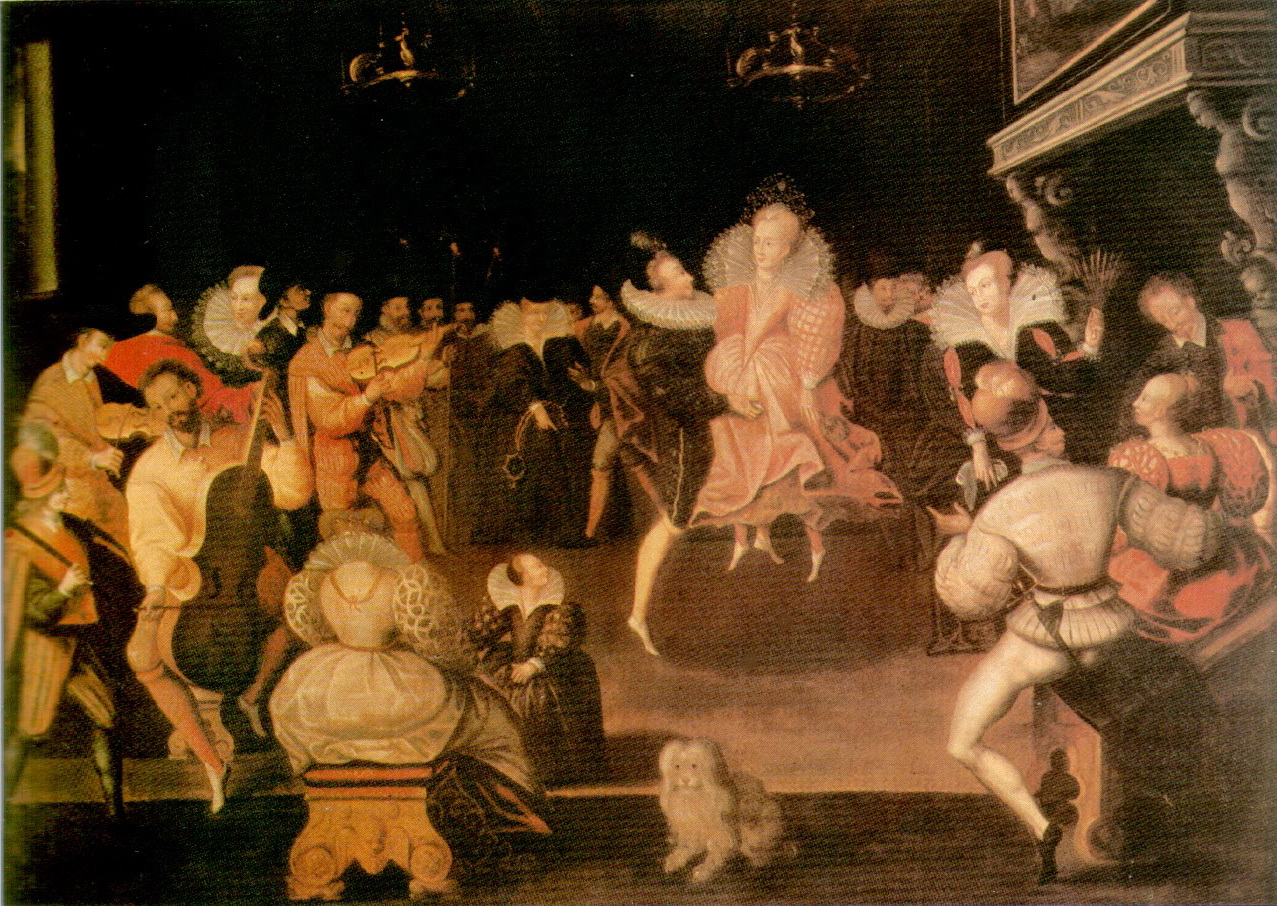
Unknown dancers performing lavolta. The painting is currently in Penshurst Place in Kent.

The galliard was a favourite dance of Queen Elizabeth I of England, and although it is a relatively vigorous dance, in 1589, when the Queen was aged in her mid-fifties, John Stanhope of the Privy Chamber reported, "the Queen is so well as I assure you, six or seven galliards in a morning, besides music and singing, is her ordinary exercise."

A Spanish galliard was used by John of Austria to encourage the Christian league at the Battle of Lepanto. Before the two fleets could clash, he came out to the deck of his flagship La Real and danced along with two other captains to the music of fifes.

While most commonly being an entire dance, the galliard's steps are used within many other forms of dance. For example, 16th-century Italian dances in Fabritio Caroso's (1581) and Cesare Negri's (1602) dance manuals often have a galliard section.

One special step used during a galliard is lavolta, a step which involves an intimate, close hold between a couple, with the woman being lifted into the air and the couple turning 270 degrees, within one six-beat measure. Lavolta was considered by some dancing masters as an inappropriate dance.

Another special step used during a galliard is the tassel kick ("salto del fiocco"). These steps are found in Negri's manual and involve a galliard step usually (though not always) ending with a spin. The easier steps involve single spins of 180 or 360 degrees; later, more difficult steps involve multiple sequential spins and spins of up to at least 540 degrees. During the spin, the dancer kicks out to touch a tassel suspended between knee and waist height.

== Musical form ==
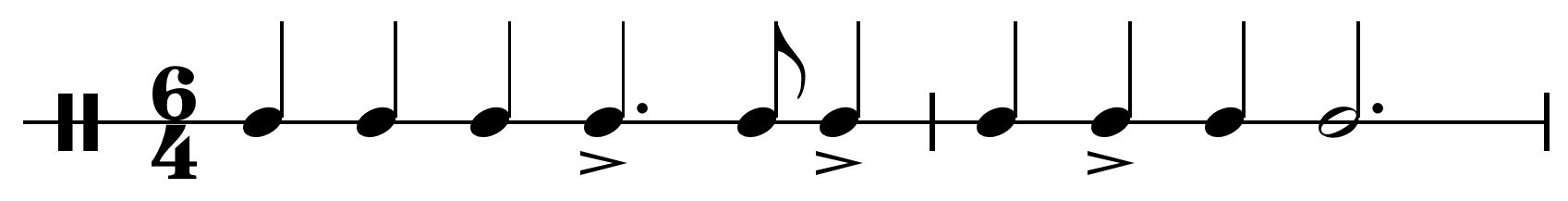
Galliard rhythm

Musical compositions in the galliard form appear to have been written and performed after the dance fell out of popular use. In musical compositions, the galliard often filled the role of an after dance written in 6, which followed and mimicked another piece (sometimes a pavane) written in 4. The distinctive 6 beats to the phrase can still be heard today in songs such as "God Save the King".

== See also ==
- List of dances
- Saltarello

== General sources ==
- Caroso, Fabritio (1581). Il ballarino. 2 volumes. Venice: Francesco Ziletti. Facsimile reprint in one volume, Monuments of Music and Music Literature in Facsimile. second series: Music Literature, 46, New York: Broude Brothers, 1967.
- Negri, Cesare (1602). Le Gratie d'amore. Milan. Facsimile reprints, (1) Bibliotheca musica Bononiensis, Sez. 2, n. 104, Bologna: Forni Editore, 1969; (2) Monuments of Music and Music Literature in Facsimile. second series: Music Literature, no. 141, New York: Broude Bros., 1969.
