= Volta (dance) =

Type of Renaissance dance

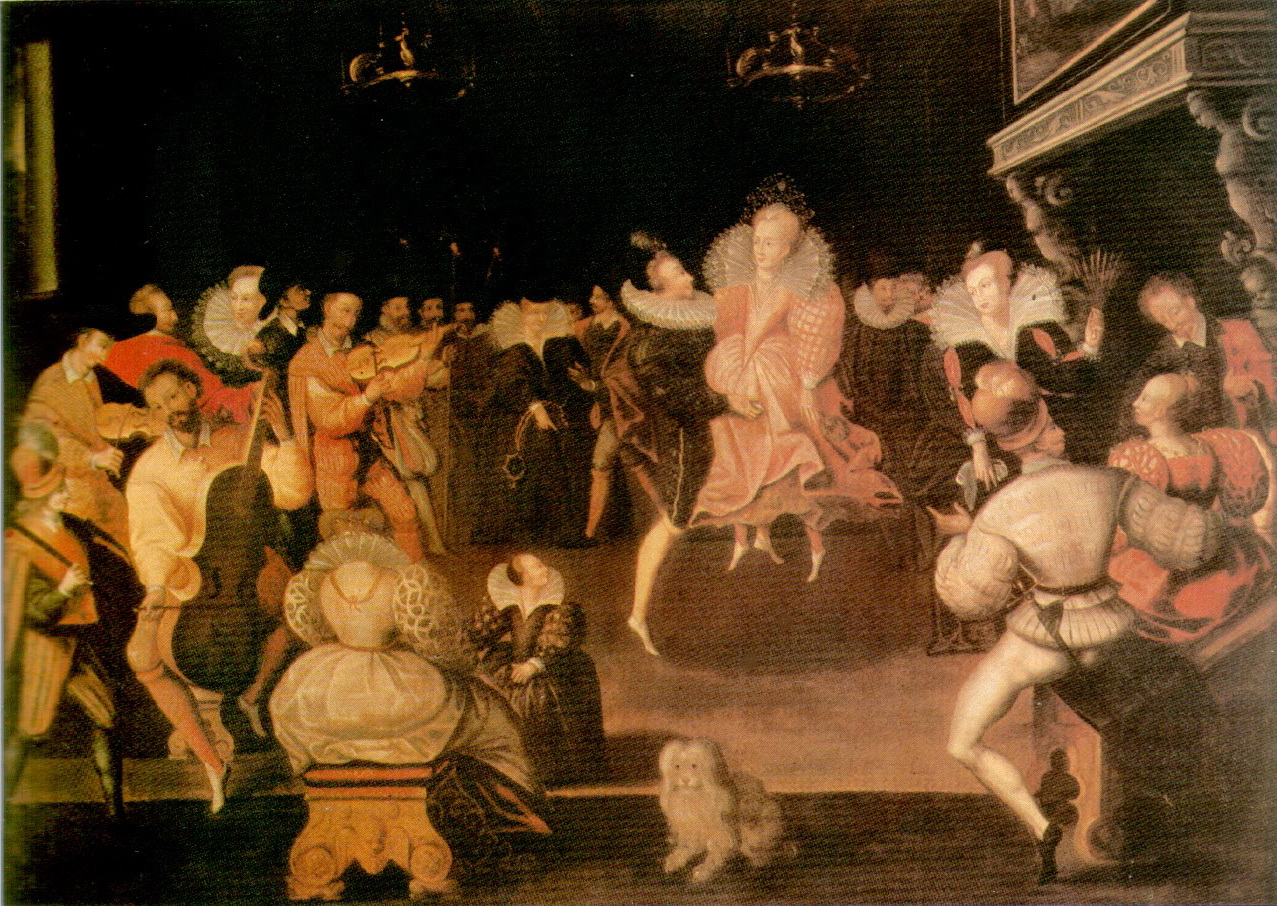
Despite its mocking title, Queen Elizabeth I Dancing with Robert Dudley, Earl of Leicester, this painting of the lavolta is from the French Valois school and depicts unknown dancers. It is currently in Penshurst Place in Kent.

The volta (plural: voltas) (Italian: "the turn" or "turning") is an anglicised name for a dance for couples that was popular during the later Renaissance period. This dance was associated with the galliard and done to the same kind of music. Its main figure consisted of a turn and lift in a sort of closed position, which could be done either to the right or to the left. It is also called La volta, Volta, Volte. Spelling variants include la volta and levolto; its name is la volte in French and la volta in Italian. It was considered at first to be risque and controversial. Although the dance was known at the court of Elizabeth I, the popular notion (much portrayed in film and television) that Elizabeth and her favourite Lord Robert Dudley regularly performed the volta is unknown.

== Description ==
Detailed instructions for voltas were written by Thoinot Arbeau; some brief notes appear in MS Douce 280. (about 1606) These instructions are open to some interpretation, but seem to indicate something like the following.

The dance begins with a galliard. Then the couple makes a transition to a closed position. The leader (the man, according to period custom) lets go of his partner's hand and takes hold of her below her busk with one hand, and places the other hand on her back above the far hip. The follower places her near hand on top of her partner's near shoulder. Now the leader is facing his partner while she faces to one side; both will do the turn with forward steps, and both step with the same foot at the same time.

The turn begins with a small step, springing onto the outside foot and lifting the inside foot forward. On the second beat there is a longer step, stepping smoothly onto the inside foot and staying close to the ground. During this step the follower poises herself for a spring, and just after it she springs up into the air. The leader lifts her with his hands, then holds her up with his hands and with the thigh of his free leg under her thighs. He lets her down to land on both feet on the last beat of the measure. The couple makes an approximate 3/4 turn during each measure. The turn is repeated ad lib for several measures, and then the galliard is resumed in an open position.

== Relations to other dances ==
It is sometimes hypothesized that the volta was the direct ancestor of the waltz. However, with experience, it can be seen from the above instructions (or from Thoinot Arbeau's instructions) that the dances are fundamentally different. The volta is more similar to the polska, though there again the differences remain large. The most that might reasonably be assumed is that the development of either the waltz or the polska might have been influenced in some way by the volta.

== References in modern culture ==
- An inaccurate example of this dance in the movie Elizabeth (1998), where Cate Blanchett (Queen Elizabeth I) and Joseph Fiennes (Lord Robert Dudley) dance it on two occasions.
- A somewhat more accurate version of the volta can be seen in the movie Shakespeare in Love (1998), this time with Joseph Fiennes playing William Shakespeare and Gwyneth Paltrow as Viola De Lesseps.
- A very accurate version can be seen in Elizabeth: The Golden Age (sequel to Elizabeth) between Elizabeth "Bess" Throckmorton and Sir Walter Raleigh.
- In the second season's seventh episode of Showtime's original series The Tudors, Jonathan Rhys Meyers playing Henry VIII and Natalie Dormer as Anne Boleyn perform a dance that is said to be a Volta; but is actually a fragment of the Canticles of Holy Mary, a Spanish medieval compliance of religious hymns.
- A version of volta can be seen performed in the 1953 film The Sword and the Rose.
- This dance is also performed in the third episode of 1971's Elizabeth R, "Shadow in the Sun" between Queen Elizabeth (Glenda Jackson) and Robert Dudley (Robert Hardy).
- On 23 June 2009 the contestants on Big Brother 10 (UK Channel 4) were given the task to perform The Volta, with the performance shown the following evening.

== Bibliography ==
- Brissenden, Alan. Shakespeare and the Dance. London: The MacMillan Press, 1981.
- Arbeau, Thoinot. Orchesography. Langres, 1589. Translated by Mary Stewart Evans; Introduction and Notes by Julia Sutton. New York: Dover Publications, Inc., 1967.
