= Basse danse =

Renaissance court dance

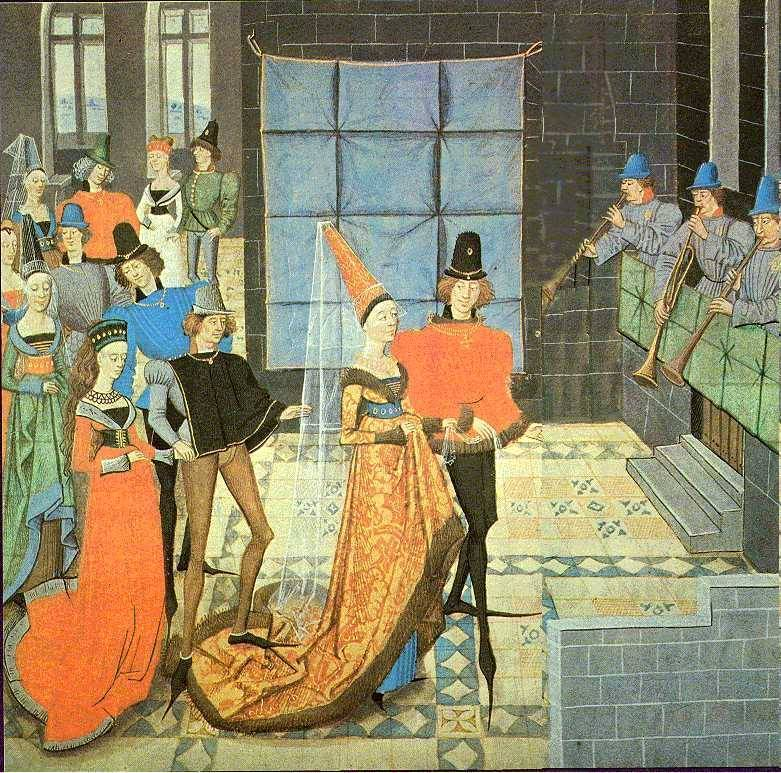
A courtly basse dance

The basse danse, or "low dance", was a popular court dance in the 15th and early 16th centuries, especially at the Burgundian court. The word basse describes the nature of the dance, in which partners move quietly and gracefully in a slow gliding or walking motion without leaving the floor, while in livelier dances both feet left the floor in jumps or leaps. The basse danse was a precursor of the pavane as a dignified processional dance. The term may apply to the dance or the music alone.

== History ==
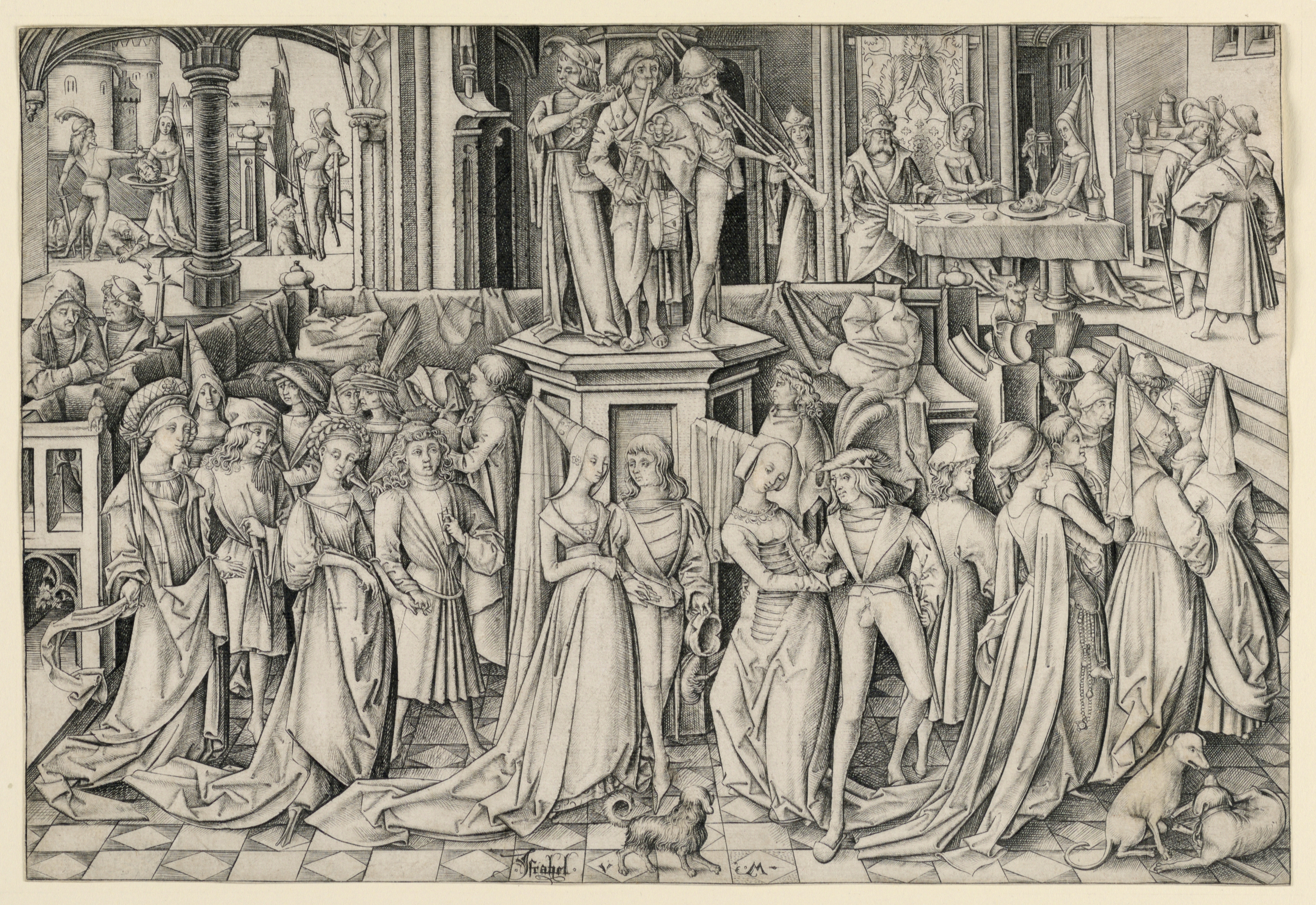
Dance at Herod's Court, an engraving by Israhel van Meckenem, ca. 1490.

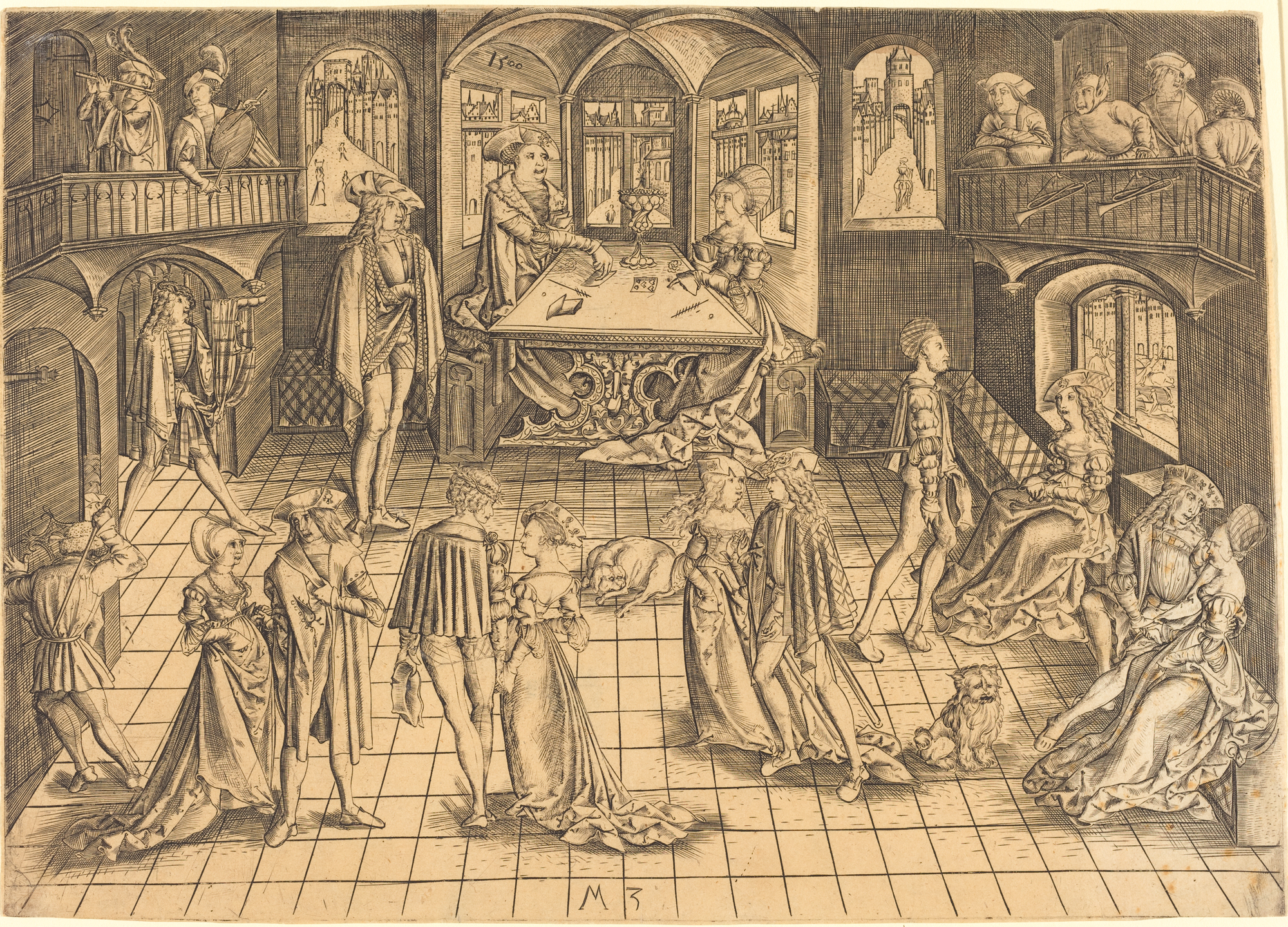
The Grand Ball, engraving by Master MZ dated 1500; it shows the court in Munich

The earliest record of a basse danse is found in an Occitan poem of the 1320s by Raimon de Cornet, who notes that the joglars performed them.

The bassa danza is described in the dance treatise of Guglielmo Ebreo da Pesaro, in northern Italy towards the end of the 15th century, and by his friend Antonio Cornazzano, for whom it was the queen of all dance measures, low dance to be contrasted with the alta danza, the "high" or leaping dance called the saltarello. In Germany it became the Hofdantz.

Thoinot Arbeau used the basse danse to explain his method of dance notation in his Orchésographie (1589). The dance was danced until 1725 but was extinguished soon after by the "high" dance technique of ballet.

The general measure of the basse danse was elaborated into different named sequences of steps and movements. The basic measure is counted in sixes but, like the later courante, often combines 6/4 and 3/2 time, using hemiola to divide the six as 3–3 or as 2–2–2. This rhythm matches the basic steps of the dance. Most basse danse music is in binary form with each section repeated.

The basse danse was often followed by a tourdion, due to their contrasting tempi, and these were danced and composed in pairs en suite like the "pavane and galliard" and the "allemande and courante".

Early music consisted of songs based on a tenor cantus firmus and the length of the choreography was often derived from the verse of the chanson. In performance three or four instrumentalists would improvise the polyphony based on this tenor. In others multiple parts were written, though choice of instrumentation was left to the performers.

Most famous, perhaps, are the basses danses assembled in 1530 by Pierre Attaingnant in the "Attaingnant Dance Prints", which were for four voices, typically improvised upon by adding melodic embellishment (Attaingnant rarely wrote ornamentation, though he did in "Pavin of Albart", an embellishment on "Pavane 'Si je m'en vois'").

== Dance steps ==
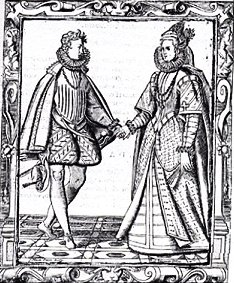
A 16th-century basse danse

A manuscript in the Royal Library of Belgium in Brussels gives us information about the elements of basse danse and the choreography of specific examples. The basse danse is based upon four steps: pas simple, pas double, démarche (also known as the reprise) and branle.

- Pas simples are done in pairs, dancers take two steps (typically first left and then right) in one measure counting 2–2–2.
- In pas double, dancers take instead three steps, counting 3–3. These steps take advantage of the hemiola feel of the basse danse.
- In the démarche, dancers take a step backwards and shift their weight forward and then back in three motions in the feel of 3/2.
- In the branle, dancers step to the left, shifting their weight left, and then close again, in two motions in the feel of 6/4.

The révérence, occurring typically before or after the choreography, is a bow or curtsy that takes place over the course of one measure.

== See also ==
- Brussels Basse Danse Manuscript
- Social dance

== Sources ==
- Kirstein, Lincoln (1969). Dance – A Short History of Classical Theatrical Dancing. Dance Horizons Incorporated.

Footnotes
