= Italian folk dance =

Part of Italian culture

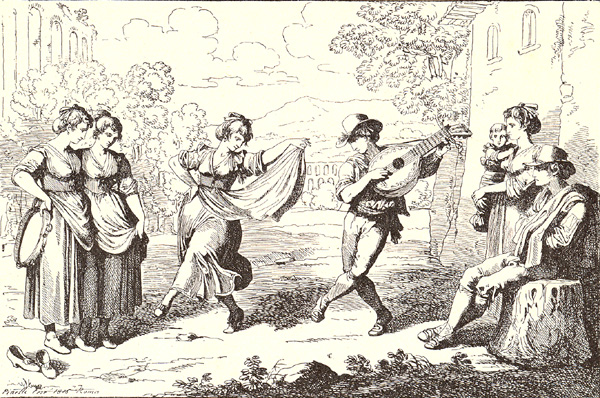
The saltarello

Italian folk dance has been an integral part of Italian culture for centuries. Dance has been a continuous thread in Italian life from Dante through the Renaissance, the advent of the tarantella in southern Italy, and the modern revivals of folk music and dance.

== History ==
=== Middle Ages ===
The carol or carole (carola in Italian), a circle or chain dance which incorporates singing, was the dominant Medieval dance form in Europe from at least the 12th through the 14th centuries. This form of dance was found in Italy as well and although Dante has a few fleeting references to dance, it is Dante's contemporary Giovanni del Virgilio (floruit 1319–1327) who gives us the earliest mention of Italian folk dance. He describes a group of women leaving a church in Bologna at the festa of San Giovanni; they form a circle with the leader singing the first stanza at the end of which the dancers stop and, dropping hands, sing the refrain. The circle then reforms and the leader goes on to the next stanza.

==== Boccaccio ====
However, it is Giovanni Boccaccio (1313–1375) who illustrates the social function of dance in the Decameron (about 1350–1353). In Boccaccio's masterpiece, a group of men and women have traveled to a countryside villa to escape the Black Death and they tell a series of stories to while away the time. There are also social activities before and after the stories which include song and dance. After breakfast at the beginning of the first day:

"E levate le tavole, con ciò fosse cosa che tutte le donne carolar sapessero e similmente i giovani e parte di loro ottimamente e sonare e cantare, comandò la reina che gli strumenti venissero; e per comandamento di lei, Dioneo preso un liuto e la Fiammetta una viuola, cominciarono soavemente una danza a sonare; [107] per che la reina con l'altre donne insieme co' due giovani presa una carola, con lento passo, mandati i famigliari a mangiare, a carolar cominciarono; e quella finita, canzoni vaghette e liete cominciarono a cantare. [108]"

"Breakfast done, the tables were removed, and the queen bade fetch instruments of music; for all, ladies and young men alike, knew how to tread a measure, and some of them played and sang with great skill: so, at her command, Dioneo having taken a lute, and Fiammetta a viol, they struck up a dance in sweet concert; [107] and, the servants being dismissed to their repast, the queen, attended by the other ladies and the two young men, led off a stately carol; which ended they fell to singing ditties dainty and gay. [108]"

For each of the ten days, song and dance are part of the storytellers' activities—at the end of the sixth day:

"[037] E poi che bagnati si furono e rivestiti, per ciò che troppo tardi si faceva, se ne tornarono a casa, dove trovarono le donne che facevano una carola a un verso che facea la Fiammetta..."

"[037] Then, as the hour was very late, they did but bathe, and as soon as they had resumed their clothes, returned to the ladies, whom they found dancing a carol to an air that Fiammetta sang..."

And further after storytelling on the seventh day:

"intorno della bella fontana di presente furono in sul danzare, quando al suono della cornamusa di Tindaro e quando d'altri suon carolando. [009]"

"they presently gathered for the dance about the fair fountain, and now they footed it to the strains of Tindaro's cornemuse, and now to other music. [009]"

The dance passages in the Decameron show that the carol was always sung but could be accompanied by instrumental music as well, both men and women danced, although women seem to dance more often than men, and all knew how to dance.

Boccaccio also uses two other terms besides carola to describe the dances done, danza and ballo. Some scholars assume that all the terms are synonymous since the dance forms are given no distinctive description, but others take these to mean separate dances and trace the names forward to the Renaissance dances bassadanza and ballo.

==== Dance in the countryside ====
These descriptions from Boccaccio are, of course, all of townsfolk dancing but the Decameron also gives at least a glimpse at peasant dances as well. In the second story of the Eighth Day about the priest and Monna Belcolore, of the latter the story says:

"e oltre a ciò era quella che meglio sapeva sonare il cembalo e cantare L'acqua corre la borrana, e menare la ridda e il ballonchio, quando bisogno faceva, che vicina che ella avesse, con bel moccichino e gentile in mano. [010]"

"Moreover she had not her match in playing the tabret and singing: "The borage is full sappy", and in leading a brawl or a breakdown, no matter who might be next her, with a fair and dainty kerchief in her hand. [010]"

The two terms for dance that Boccaccio uses, ridda and ballonchio, both refer to round dances with singing. Another variant of the round dance with song is the Righoletto, known from Florence and the surrounding countryside in the 14th and 15th centuries

==== Istanpitta and others ====
In a 14th-century Italian manuscript in the British Library (Add. 29987), folios 55v-58r and 59v-63v, contain 15 monophonic pieces of music, the first eight of which are labeled istanpitta. Of the next seven pieces, 4 are called saltarello, one trotto, one Lamento di Tristano, and the final one is labeled La Manfredina. These are the only known examples of instrumental dance music from Italy in the Middle Ages and all of them have similarities to earlier French dance pieces called estampie.

There is divided opinion on the question of whether the estampie / istanpitta was actually a dance or simply a musical form. Curt Sachs in his World History of the Dance believes the strong rhythm of the music, the name, which he derives from a term "to stamp", and literary references point to the estampie definitely being a dance. Vellekoop, on the other hand, looks at the evidence and concludes that estampie was simply a name for early instrumental music.

The other seven dances in the manuscript have the same general musical structure as those labeled "istanpitta" but are simpler and probably more suitable for dancing. Saltarello is a dance name found in later centuries as well but the later examples may not refer to the same dance as these 14th-century pieces. The last two dances in the manuscript, Lamento di Tristano and La Manfredina are notable as being pairs of related dances, a scheme which became common in Renaissance dance.

==== Depictions of dance ====
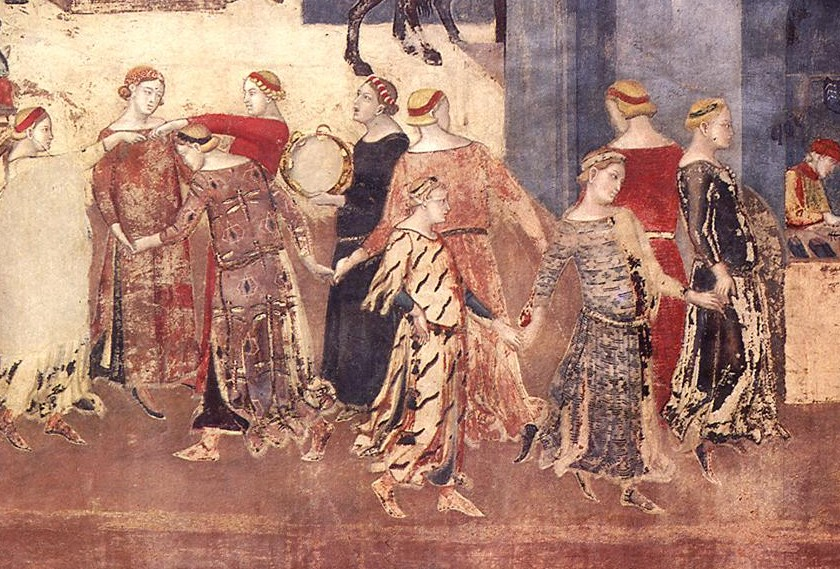
Lorenzetti 1338–40

One of the earliest known depictions of Italian folk dance is part of a set of frescoes at the Palazzo Pubblico in Siena by Ambrogio Lorenzetti (about 1285–1348). Part of his Allegory of Good Government (Effetto del Buon Governo) painted about 1338–40 shows a group of nine dancers, all women and accompanied by another woman singing and playing on the tambourine, executing a "bridge" figure where dancers go under the joined hands of the two lead dancers.

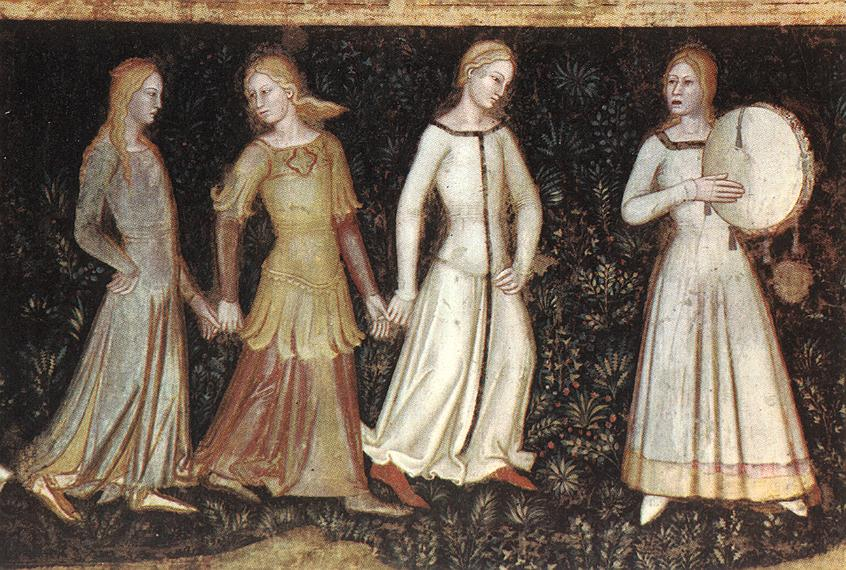
Andrea Bonaiuti

Another 14th-century illustration comes from the Florentine painter Andrea Bonaiuti (1343–1377). One of his series of paintings The Church Militant and Triumphant (Chiesa militante e trionfante) done in 1365 at a chapel in the church of Santa Maria Novella in Florence also shows women dancing accompanied by a woman on tambourine.

=== Renaissance ===
It can be seen in Simone Prodenzani's Liber Saporecti (or Il Saporetto), published 1415, which describes music and dance at an imaginary court, and from other works, that in the early 15th century the direction of transmission of dance forms was from the popular folk dances of the towns and countryside to the courts of the nobility. But a new attitude appears at court which elevates dance to an art form. In the Medieval period, no writer describes dance steps or figures, it being assumed that everyone knew how to dance. By the early Renaissance the simple circle and chain dances of the earlier centuries still exist—there are references to the round dance (ridda) and dancing in circles as late as the early 16th century in Straparola's Le piacevoli notti (The Facetious Nights of Straparola). But we also find that couple dances and mimetic elements now appear and formal choreographies emerge for the first time. This new Art of the Dance can especially be seen at the major courts of Milan, Padua, Venice, Florence, Bologna, Pesaro, Urbino, and Naples.

==== Dance manuals ====
With dancing elevated to new heights, dancing masters make their appearance at court and the first dance manuals are known from the middle of the 15th century.

- Domenico da Piacenza: De arte saltandi & choreas ducendi. De la arte di ballare et danzare (mid-15th century)
- Antonio Cornazano: Libro del'arte del danzare (about 1455)
- Guglielmo Ebreo da Pesaro: De practica seu arte tripudii vulgare opusculum (about 1463)
- Fabritio Caroso: Il Ballarino (1581) Venice
- Fabritio Caroso: Nobilita di Dame (1600) Venice
- Livio Lupi: Mutanze di gagliarda, tordiglione, passo e mezzo, canari e passegi (1600) Palermo
- Cesare Negri: Le Gratie d'Amore (1602) Milan & reissued as Nuove Inventione di Balli (1604) Milan

The three 15th-century treatises divide their dances into two types, the bassadanza and the ballo, possibly related to the earlier simple dance forms of Boccaccio's time. The bassadanza, allied to the similar French basse dance, is a slow dignified dance without leaps or hops, while the ballo was a livelier dance often containing pantomimic elements. The terms saltarello or piva were sometimes used for more sprightly versions of the ballo. The dances are for couples, holding hands or in lines. Dances in the manuscripts were often given rather fanciful names, e.g. Lioncello, Gioioso and Rosina, which are often found in more than one work and occasionally as dance names in later times as well.

==== Late Renaissance dance ====
In the late 16th and early 17th century manuals of Caroso and Negri, a variety of dance types can be seen: slow processional dances, longways, various dances for single couples and even a few for trios or five dancers. All are social dances for both sexes with the men's steps being more athletic than the women's. In all the dances the upper body is kept erect, the arms are quiet and there is little movement above the waist.

Dance suites usually started with a walking sequence, pavana, a term often found in the music of the time but almost never in dance manuals. The passo e mezzo (lit. 'step-and-a-half') seems to have been a faster variant of the pavana. The faster, athletic gagliarda often followed the pavana but was also done as a separate dance. Other similar fast afterdances were the tordiglione and the saltarello (another term seen more often in music than dance descriptions). Further types were the spagnoletta and the canario with its unique stamping patterns.

Some of these names are seen again in the 1588 poem about life in Naples, Ritratto ... di Napoli by Gian Battista del Tufo (about 1548–1600) where dances such as Spagnoletta or Tordiglione, and Rogier, Lo Brando, and Passo e mezzo are mentioned but not described. But he does tell of a dance with Arab influence and movements from Malta, the Sfessania. Some decades later we find Villanella, and once again Ruggiero, Sfessania and Spagnoletta in Giambattista Basile's collection of Neapolitan fairy tales, the Pentameron (published 1634–36). No reference is made in either work to the name which would later be the definitive dance of Naples, the tarantella, but Bragaglia thinks that the Sfessania can be regarded as the ancestor of that dance.

Even by the late Renaissance and the elaborate choreographies of Caroso, a link between court dance and country or folk dance can be seen. Elements of folk dance invigorate courtly dances and folk dances take over movements and styles from courtly dance. The difference between the two forms was probably one of style and elegance.

=== 18th & 19th centuries ===
By the 18th century, the name "tarantella" appears in illustrations and travelers's accounts in southern Italy. When the German writer Goethe describes the tarantella which he saw performed in Naples during his trip to Italy in 1786–87, it appears as a dance for women only, two girls dancing with castanets accompanied by a third on the tambourine. Madame de Staël had also traveled in Italy and in her 1817 novel Corinne, or Italy, she has her heroine dance the tarantella as a solo. But the tarantella as a couple dance telling a story of love in mime does appear in a description by Orgitano in the middle of the 19th century.

Also appearing in illustrations and texts is the saltarello as a rustic dance of Romagna, central Italy. This is a name which also appears in the earliest Italian dance music and throughout the Renaissance. It is not clear, however, that these various mentions represent the same or even related dances.

In the north, in Venice, there was the "wild courtship dance", known as Furlana or Forlana, which was danced by Giacomo Casanova in 1775.

References to figure dances similar to English country dances and French Contradanses also appear as early as the first part of the 18th century. Dances of this type from the 18th and 19th centuries in Italy include La Contraddanza, Quadriglia and Il Codiglione. A letter from the English writer and politician Horace Walpole dated 1740 from Florence declares, "The Italians are fond to a degree of our country dances."

=== Dance research ===
One of the earliest attempts to systematically collect folk dances is Gaspare Ungarelli's 1894 work Le vecchie danze italiane ancora in uso nella provincia bolognese ('Old Italian dances still in use in the province of Bologna') which gives brief descriptions and music for some 30 dances.

In 1925, Benito Mussolini's government set up the Opera Nazionale Dopolavoro (OND) or National Recreational Club as a means of promoting sports and cultural activities and one of its accomplishments was a wide survey of folk music and dance in Italy at that time. The work was published in 1931 as Costumi, musica, danze e feste popolari italiane ('Italian popular customs, music, dance and festivals'). In September 1945 OND was replaced by a new organization, the Ente Nazionale Assistenza Lavoratori (ENAL), headquartered in Rome. In partnership with the International Folk Music Council, ENAL sponsored a Congress and Festival in Venice September 7–11, 1949 which included many of the outstanding researchers in Italian folklore as well as folk dance and music groups from various Italian regions.

ENAL was dissolved in late 1978 but earlier in October 1970, the Italian folklore groups who had been members of ENAL set up a separate organization, which in 1978 became the Federazione Italiana Tradizioni Populari (FITP). The FITP publishes a newsletter and a scholarly publication Il Folklore D'Italia.

Some prominent 20th-century Italian folk dance researchers are Anton Giulio Bragaglia, Diego Carpitella, Antonio Cornoldi, Giuseppe Michele Gala, Bianca Maria Galanti, Giorgio Nataletti, Placida Staro and Paolo Toschi. (see Bibliography)

An interest in preserving and fostering folk art, music and dance among Italian Americans and the dedication and leadership of Elba Farabegoli Gurzau led to the formation of the Italian Folk Art Federation of America (IFAFA) in May 1979. The group sponsors an annual conference and has published a newsletter, Tradizioni, since 1980.

== Folk dances by region ==
=== Northern Italy ===
Regions of Italy

Northern Italy refers to the regions of Aosta Valley, Piedmont, Liguria, Lombardy, Veneto, Emilia-Romagna, Friuli-Venezia Giulia, and Trentino-Alto Adige.

- Monferrina: Monferrina is a dance in 6/8 time originating in the Piedmont district of Monferrat but now widespread in northern and central Italy. It has a two-part structure, promenade followed by a couple figure.
- Girometta: peasant couple dance of Bologna in 2/4 time in three parts, a promenade around, the dance proper, and a final turning figure.
- Giga: in this 6/8 rhythm dance, the couples make two promenades and then begin the dance proper: hand-in-hand two steps forward, then change hands and go two steps backward; the couple then interlaces arms and dances, then the man raises his arms with the woman turning underneath them to separate and begin the dance over.
- Ruggero: this dance in 2/4 rhythm is done by two men and two women in the form of a diamond, with the men opposite the women. One couple makes four promenade tours around, the woman then stops to form a group with the second couple who then all circle around. They then separate and go to the first man and make another tour returning to place. The dance begins again with the other couple starting the figures.
- Galletta: a rustic dance in 6/8 time from the province of Bologna. In the Valle di Reno it is done with one man and two women, one on each side of the man, while in Valle di Savenna the dance is for two men and two women, the men in the center, back-to-back, with their partners in front of them.
- Veneziana: well-known dance of Bologna done by four dancers or sometimes more (in Pianora), accompanied by a song. The formation is a diamond when done by four dancers or two facing rows of men and women when more than four take part. Men and women cross over to each other's positions during the dance.
- Bergamasca: the Bergamasca is known from Romagna as a dance for a single couple but another type uses three couples. Ungarelli describes a third type in 2/4 time with turning figures.

==== Weapon dances ====
Several types of weapon dances are known from Italy, the mock battle (Moresca), sword dances and stick dances. A number of these are from the Piedmont region of northern Italy:

- Spadonari di San Giorgio: a sword dance done for the festival of San Giorgio in the Piedmont village of San Giorio di Susa. There is a historical prologue section, followed by the sword dance proper, and then a procession and banquet. The six swordsmen, selected from the best looking men in the village and costumed in white with red vertical bands and black felt hats with flowers, are armed with a large, slightly curved sword. There are five figures to the dance all performed to a drum roll in march rhythm:

1) With a leap, the dancers turn in the air and move into a square formation and shake their swords
2) With a short leap, the points of the swords are joined on the ground, then again at shoulder level
3) They return to place and drag the swords on the ground making a furrow
4) With four synchronized leaps, all turn east, west, south, and north
5) The swords are exchanged by throwing them in the air
The dancers then march off to the drum.

- Spadonari di Venaus: a sword dance from Venaus in the Val di Susa done for the feast of San Biagio. Four men clothed in a fastastic imitation of medieval warriors perform with large two-handed swords. The dance lasts about an hour and has only a few figures: raising the sword in salute, circling the sword in the air, striking the sword of their adversary and throwing the swords in the air in exchange.
- Spadonari di San Vicenzo: done for St. Vincent's Day (January 21) in the village of Giaglione in Val di Susa, four swordsmen in plumed helmets take part in a procession which finishes at the piazza where a mock fight is held.
- Bal dâ Sabbre: a sword dance from Fenestrelle in Piedmont done for the feast of San Luigi (August 25). The dance is done by 16 spadonari preceded by two Heralds and a drummer and followed by a Harlequin and a "Turk". This is not a mock combat but a point-and-hilt type sword dance with typical "rose" figures which imprison the Harlequin. In the second part of the dance, the swords are dropped, and colored ribbons attached to a pole are taken up and woven into braids.

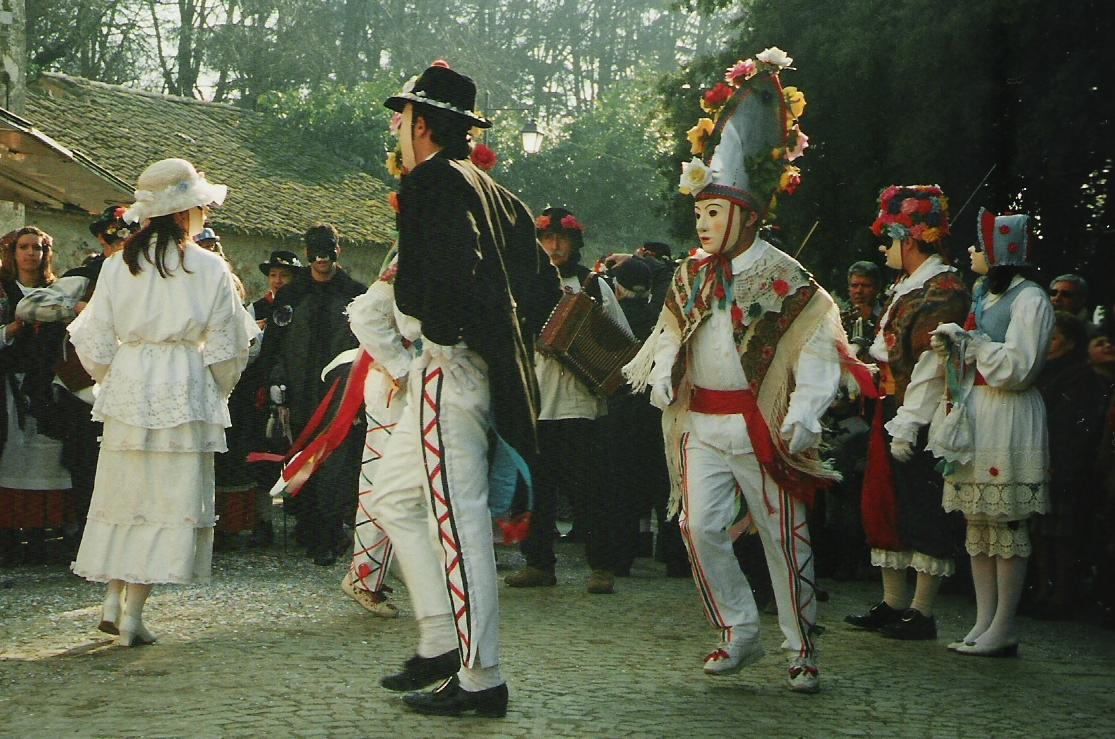
Lachera group

- Lachera: this dance, from the town of Rocca Grimalda in Piedmont, is a transformed weapon dance. According to tradition, it derived from a revolt against the medieval tyrant Isnardo Malaspina. An engaged couple are accompanied in the dance by an escort of two masked Lacheri who do a characteristic dance with high leaps. Also present are three armed figures, two guerrieri and a zuavo.

==== Friuli ====
The region of Friuli has been a crossroads for different cultures throughout the centuries. The inhabitants are mostly Italian speaking as well as the local Friulan language but German and Slovenian are also spoken in some areas.

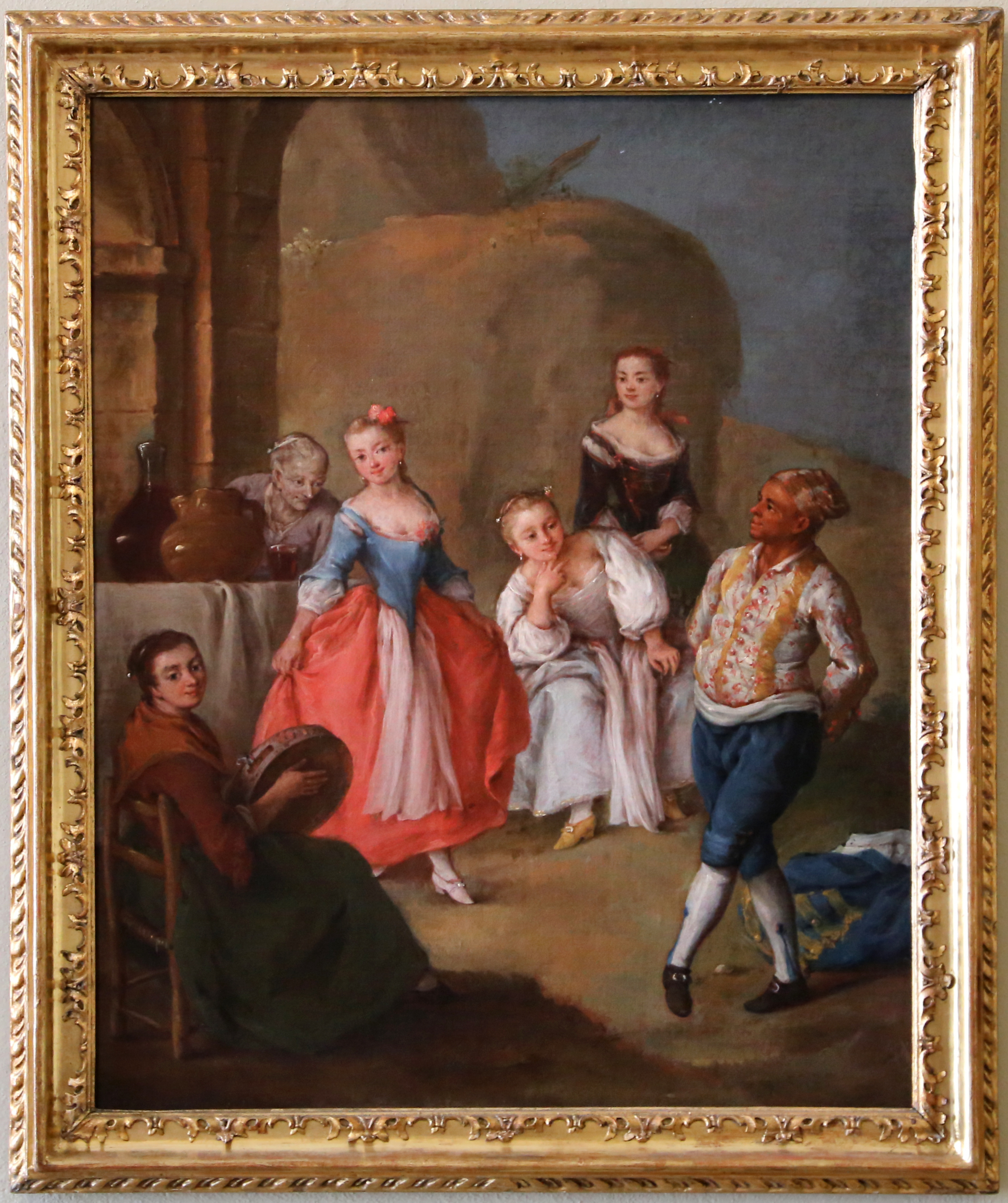
La Furlana, Pietro Longhi (1750—1755)

- Furlana: widespread couple dance in 3/4 time with several variations throughout Friuli. It usually involves a handkerchief and several figures which can be seen as flirtation, courting, fighting and making-up.
- Vinca or Bal Del Truc: a couple dance in 2/4 which alternates a skipping figure with a mock scolding with stamping, clapping and finger pointing. The dance is almost identical with a number of other folk dances from Central and Eastern Europe.
- Lavandera: the Lavandera or the "Washerwoman" is a couple dance in 2/4 rhythm with two parts, one with the women miming washing movements while the men strut like roosters and the other a type of antique polka.
- Quadriglia di Aviano: a dance in square formation for four couples in 2/4 rhythm. In the pattern of the dance, the head couples change places followed by a figure where all the men proceed to the women on their right, do a turning figure with them and then go on to repeat this with the second woman to their right. The side couples then exchange places and the men repeat their travel figure which brings them back to their original partner.
- Torototele: dance done by several couples, the women with a flower in one hand which they use to menace the man.
- Stajare: a dance originally from the Austrian province of Styria done by the nuptial couple at a wedding. A semicircle of pairs are arranged around the central couple. In the countryside, the dance is typically done in the granary as the only place large enough to accommodate relatives and friends. The dance, in waltz time, consists of an invitation to the dance and then the dance proper, accompanied by a four-part song.
- L'esclave: couple dance widespread in Friuli, partners approach and move away, the woman, holding her apron in her hand, turns while the man circles, snapping his fingers, the dance ending with a series of turns.
- Resiana or Resianca: the Val Resia region of Friuli is an island of Slavic language and culture in Italy. In his 1848 study Joseph Bergmann ("Das Thal Resia und die Resianer in Friaul", in: Anzeige-Blatt für Wissenschaft und Kunst 71, 1848, pp. 46–50) describes the Resianka of Val Resia as one done with a row of men opposite a row of women where the partners move back and forth toward and away from each other and then dance in place, always turning on the toes and never touching their partners. The woman holds the ends of her apron or a handkerchief while the man holds the front of his jacket or vest.

==== South Tyrol ====
South Tyrol is an autonomous province of Italy with a majority German-speaking population. The dance culture is similar to that of southern Germany and the Austrian state of Tyrol with such typical dances as Ländler, Schuhplattler, Dreirtanz, Schustertanz, Bregenzer and Masolka.

- Schuhplattler: this couple dance with its characteristic men's slapping patterns is known in Germany in Upper Bavaria and in Austria. The traditional area of the Schuhplattler in South Tyrol includes Passeier Valley, Sarntal, Eisacktal, Puster Valley and Drautal. The dance could still be found in its original setting until the 1930s in some areas but is now limited to performing groups.
- Ländler: Ahrntaler Ländler, which represents an older form of the Ländler, was recorded in 1940 in the villages of St. Jakob, St. Peter and Prettau in the Ahrntal.
- Siebenschritt: this very widely spread couple dance is known from various parts of Europe. It was recorded as still surviving in Passeier Valley in 1941, in de:Florutz in Fersental in 1937 and in Lüsen in 1941.
- Knödeldrahner
- Boarischer: the Boarischer is known in a number of different forms in Austria and in South Tyrol. Recently the dance has been described in Tauferertal and Ahrntal.

=== Central Italy ===
Central Italy refers to the areas of Tuscany, Marche, Umbria, Lazio, Abruzzo, and Molise.

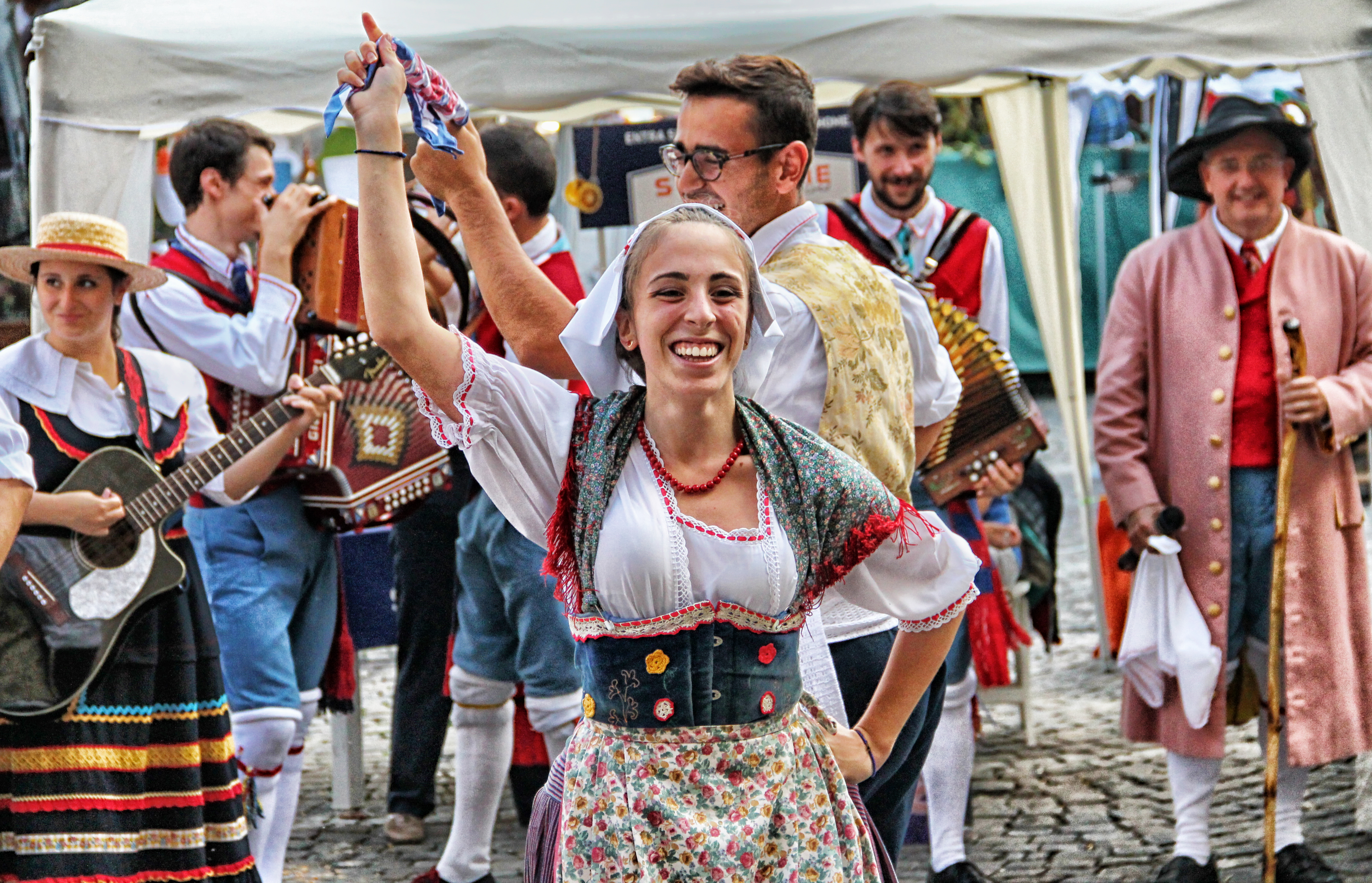
Saltarello performance in Marche

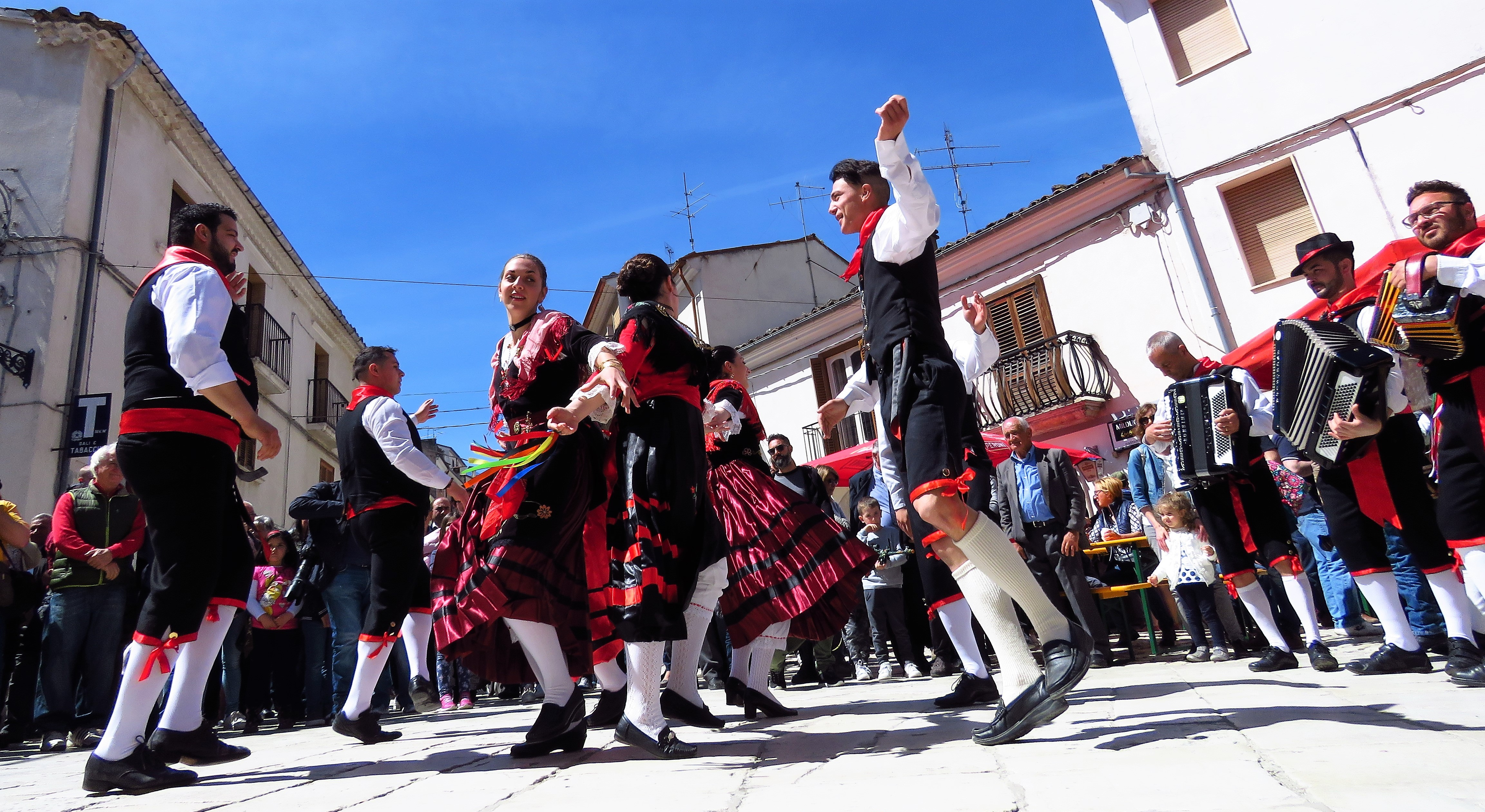
Folk dance from the comune of Fossalto, Molise

- Saltarello romagnolo
- Saltarello laziale
- Lu Sardarellu: widespread in central Italy but typical of the Marches. The dance, done by a single couple at a time, has three sections a) lu spondape where the man stamps while the woman dances in place b) lu filu where the dancers approach side-by-side while stamping, going forward and back to place c) lu fru with the dancers dancing around in a circle.
- Laccio D'Amore: an ancient traditional Maypole-type dance from Penna Sant'Andrea in Abruzzi, usually for twelve couples. The dance has several parts beginning with the men and women meeting and going in a procession with the pole. This is followed by a saltarello-style dance by the couples and then a round dance where the men (unsuccessfully) court the women. A circle is then formed around the pole, the dancers take the colored ribbons and dance a weaving figure. The ritual ends with a leave-taking dance. In the modern version, a polka precedes the weaving figure.
- Trescone: a very old dance from Tuscany in a lively 2/4 rhythm done by four couples in a square. The women dance lightly and demurely in place while the men make rapid turns and pass from one woman to another in a bravura fashion. The dance may be done in the open air at agricultural festivals or by guests at a wedding. When done at weddings, a ring of singers surrounds the four dancing couples, often improvising salacious verses about the married couple. The dance is also found in Emilia and other areas of central Italy in several different forms.
- Tresconeto: a fast dance from Tuscany in 6/8 time resembling the saltarello. The dance is usually done by a single dancer or couple and the continually increasing tempo of the dance is meant to test the endurance of the dancers. It was known in the villages of the Lunigiana district performed especially on the first Sunday of Lent.

=== Southern Italy ===
Southern Italy refers to the regions of Campania, Apulia, Basilicata, and Calabria.

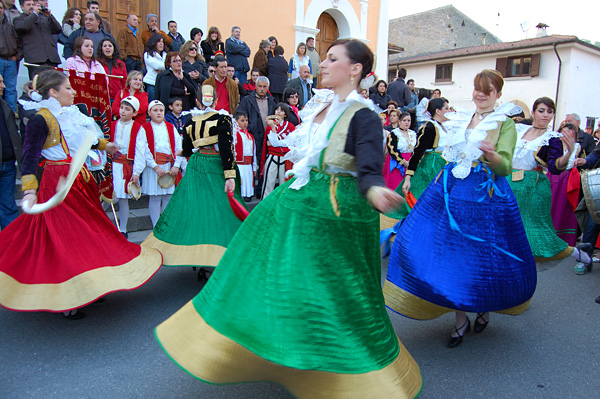
Performance of Vallje in San Basile, Calabria

- Tarantella napoletana
- Tarantella calabrese
- Ndrezzata: the name of this dance comes from intrecciata, the braid. It is a specialty of Buonopane, a part of the comune of Barano d'Ischia, on the island of Ischia. Migrants to the Americas brought the dance to New York, where it was done on the streets in 1916 and 1917, and to Buenos Aires in 1924. In its classic form, the dance has 16 dancers, with men and women taking an equal part in the dance which is accompanied by drum, flute, and song. The men carry a small stick in their right hand and a wooden sword in the left, the women reverse this. The dance is in two parts, with seven tableaus in each part, and consists of a crossing and interlacing of blows of the sticks and swords.

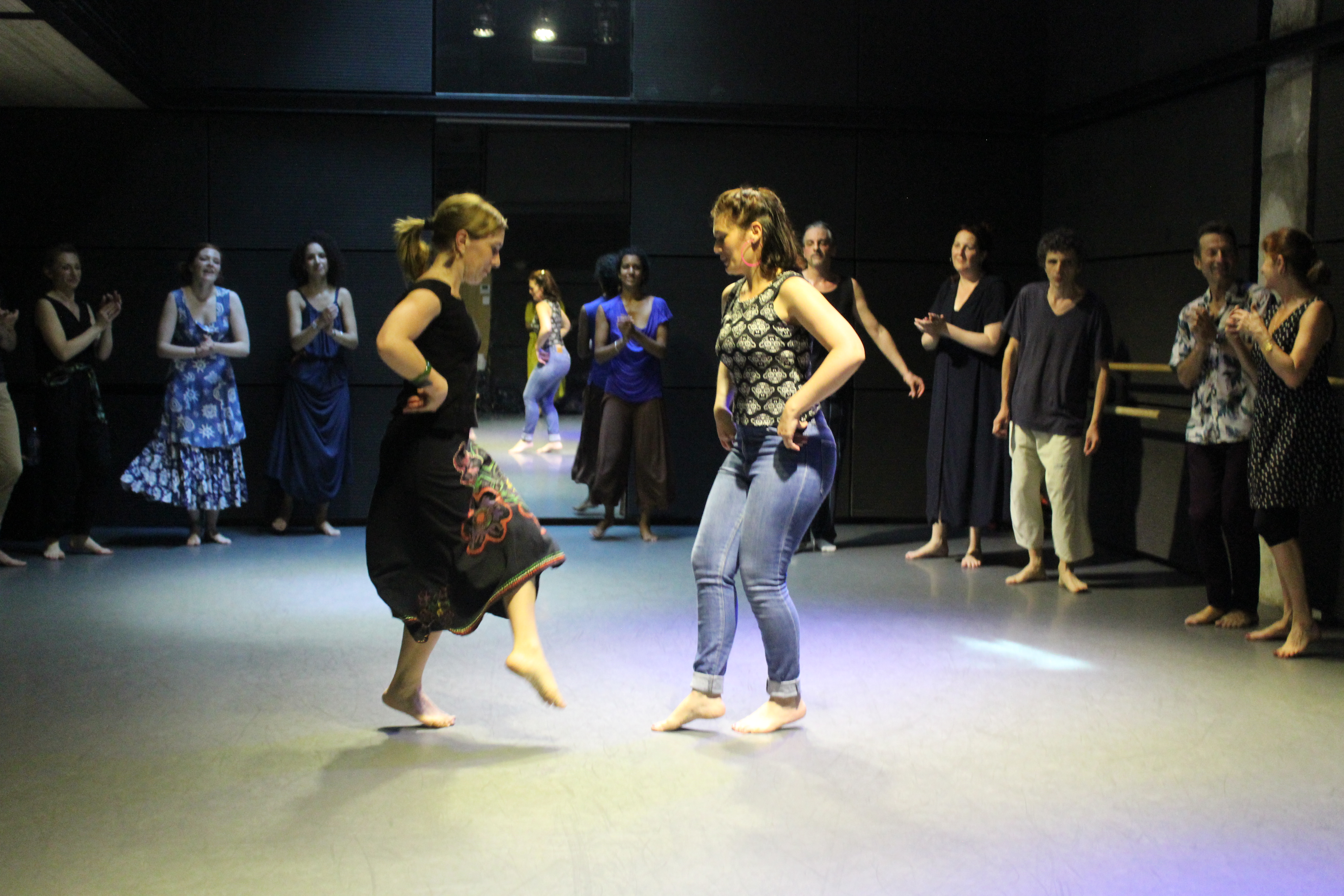
People performing the Pizzica

- Pizzica: traditional dance (in 2/4 time) of simple structure from the Apulia region.
- La Pecorara or A'Pasturara: traditional dance from Calabria in 6/8 time done to bagpipe and accordion accompaniment by one or two couples. Steps are usually close to the ground with occasional small leaps. The man, with arms akimbo keeps all his attention on the woman who holds her dress in her right hand with her left bent sharply at the hip.
- La Vala: a dance of the Arbereshe Albanian ethnic group in Calabria done in a single circle with men and women holding hands, belts or a basket-weave hold; or there may be two circles, one of men and one of women. The dance is accompanied by songs of the Albanian national hero Scanderbeg.

=== Insular Italy ===
Insular Italy refers to the regions of Sicily and Sardinia.

==== Sicily ====
- Tarantella siciliana
- Taratata: a religious sword dance from Casteltermini danced at the feast of the Holy Cross, held on the last weekend of May. A large procession, mostly on horseback, is led by a corps of 20 or so dancers who are all from the ceto of flax carders. The dancers each carry two curved swords or scimitars, the right-hand sword being used for combat while the left hand one produces the rhythm, ta-ra-ta-ta, which gives the dance its name.
- Contraddanza

==== Sardinia ====
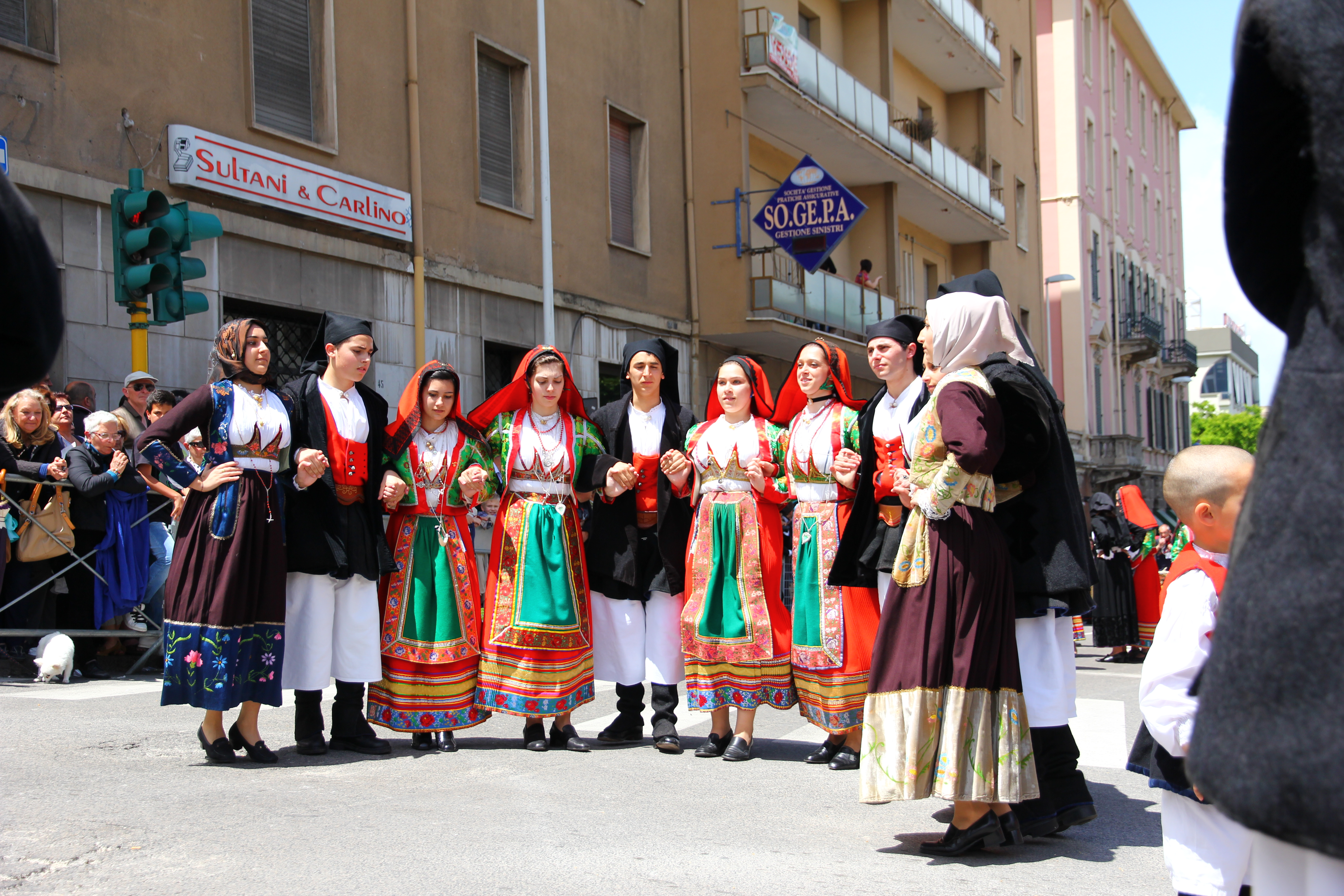
Performance of ballu tundu in Gavoi, Sardinia

- Ballu tundu: a closed or open circle dance also known as "ballu sardu", this ancient form is found all over Sardinia in many variations.

=== Other ===
==== Istria ====
The peninsula of Istria, today part of the countries of Croatia and Slovenia, belonged to the Republic of Venice (Venetian Istria) from the 13th century to 1797, and became a margraviate of the Austrian Empire in the 19th century. Later, Istria belonged to Italy from 1919 to 1947. Local ethnic Italians (Istrian Italians) made up about a third of the population in 1900, number that decreased further after the Istrian–Dalmatian exodus (1943–1960). Italian cultural influence has resulted in the resemblance of many Istrian dances to those of northern Italy. This applies to dances done by the modern day Croatian population and by the Italian national minority found today in the larger towns and some villages in the western part of Istria. Dances done by both the Croatian and the Italian communities include Molferina or Mafrina and Kvadrilja. Dances specific to the Italians include La Veneziana, Bersagliera, Denci, and more importantly the very similar dances Vilota and Furlana.

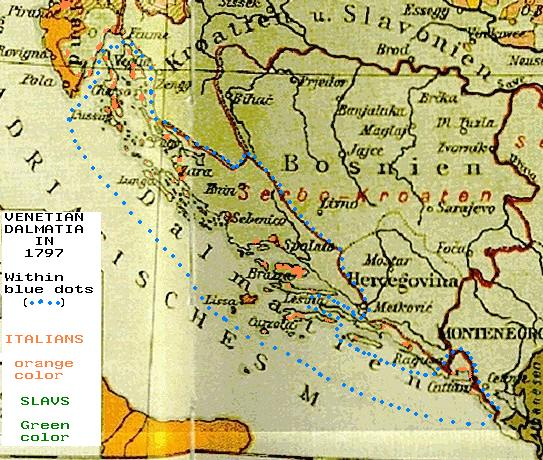
Austrian linguistic map from 1896. In green the areas where Slavs were the majority of the population, in orange the areas where Istrian Italians and Dalmatian Italians were the majority of the population. The boundaries of Venetian Dalmatia in 1797 are delimited with blue dots.

- Furlana: as danced by the Italian community in the town of Vodnjan (in Italian Dignano), this is a dance for six people consisting of two trios with one man between two women. The dance in 6/8 rhythm is composed of three figures done to accompaniment by violin and cello.
- Sette Passi: in this dance from Sveti Lovreč (in Italian San Lorenzo del Pasenatico) the man and woman face each other, embrace and then take three side-steps to the left, to the right and again to the left, then placing hands on shoulders make a full turn or two and start the dance over.

==== Dalmatia ====
Dalmatia is today part of Croatia but belonged to the Republic of Venice (Venetian Dalmatia) from 1409 to 1797, and became a kingdom of the Austrian Empire in the 19th century. Later, the Dalmatian city of Zara with other small local territories belonged to Italy from 1920 to 1947. During the World War II, from 1941 to 1943, Italy annexed a large part of Dalmatia, including it in the Governorate of Dalmatia. Dalmatia, especially its maritime cities, once had a substantial local Italian-speaking population (Dalmatian Italians). According to Austrian censuses, the Italian speakers in Dalmatia formed 12.5% of the population in 1865, but this was reduced to 2.8% in 1910, number that decreased further after the Istrian–Dalmatian exodus (1943–1960).

- Moresca: the Moresca as a weapon dance and pageant portraying a battle between Christians and Saracens was known in Italy at least as early as the 15th century but seems to have died out by the middle of the 19th century. It still exists on the Dalmatian coast in Croatia as Moreška but the battle here is between the Moors and the Turks. The dance is known from Split (in Italian Spalato), Korčula (Curzola) and Lastovo (Lagosta). There are differing accounts of the origin of the Dalmatian dance, some tracing to Italian and others to Slavic roots. Andrea Alibranti has proposed that the first appearance of the dance in Korčula came after the defeat of the corsair Uluz Ali by the local inhabitants in 1571.
