= Joan Ambrosio Dalza =

Milanese lutenist and composer

Joan Ambrosio Dalza (fl. 1508) was a Milanese lutenist and composer. His surviving works comprise the fourth volume of Ottaviano Petrucci's influential series of lute music publications, Intabolatura de lauto libro quarto (Venice, 1508). Dalza is referred to as "milanese" in the preface, so it must be assumed he was either born in Milan, or worked there, or both.

Together with the oeuvres of Francesco Spinacino and Vincenzo Capirola, Dalza's work constitutes an important part of early Renaissance lute music. The surviving pieces comprise 42 dances, nine ricercares, five tastar de corde, four intabulations and a piece called Caldibi castigliano. The dances are arranged in miniature suites. Each of the five pavanes (five alla venetiana, four alla ferrarese) is followed by a saltarello and a piva that are thematically and harmonically related to it. Other groupings include pairs of tastar de corde with a recercar dietro. Some pieces, such as Caldibi castigliano and those titled Calate ala spagnola, show Spanish influence, possibly because of vihuela cultivation in 16th century Italy.

Dalza's music is, for the most part, comparatively simple and easy to perform. The composer himself acknowledged the fact in the preface to Petrucci's volume, and promised to publish more complex pieces at a later date. It is currently unknown whether this had been realized. Although contemporaries such as Spinacino and Capirola wrote in a more advanced idiom, Dalza's output is important because it consists almost entirely of original music, not vocal intabulations. Furthermore, Dalza's collection includes the earliest known pavanes (described as padoane diverse on the title page), which are also the earliest known variations: all pavane alla venetiana feature harmonic variations with a loosely defined tonic, and pavane alla ferrarese consist of series of open-ended phrases followed by varied repeats: AA'–BB'–CC'–.. etc. These variation forms are sometimes referred to as single-strain and multiple-strain, respectively.

Dalza's collection is also one of the very few sources to feature tastar de corde, short introductory preludes (literally, "testing of the strings"). Dalza's pieces are arranged symmetrically by key: G, C, D (with F), C (with E), G. They range from 16 (number 1) to 42 bars (numbers 3 and 4); the material essentially consists of static chords alternating with short fast passages.
