= Domenico da Piacenza =

Italian Renaissance dancing master (c. 1400–c. 1470)

Domenico da Piacenza (c. 1400 – c. 1470), also known as Domenico da Ferrara, was an Italian Renaissance dancing master. He became a very popular teacher with his students – most notably Antonio Cornazzano and Guglielmo Ebreo da Pesaro – who both later became successful dance masters. At a time between 1452 and 1463, he received the Order of the Golden Spur.

== Biography ==
Domenico was born in Piacenza, Northern Italy in around 1400, and was the first known dancing master to have left published dance instructions. He began teaching dance in around 1440 and is believed to have taught elements of dramatic mime and elaborate dance. He taught future dance masters Antonio Cornazzano and Guglielmo Ebreo da Pesaro.

He moved from Piacenza to Ferrara during Leonello d'Este's tenure as marquis of the city between 1441 and 1450. Between 1452 and 1463 Domenico received the Order of the Golden Spur, and is believed to have been knighted by Frederick III, Holy Roman Emperor. In April 1455 he composed a dance for the wedding between Tristano Sforza and Niccolò III d'Este's illegitimate daughter Beatrice.

In late 1455 he choreographed dances for the wedding between Ippolita Maria Sforza and Alfonso II. In the 1450s or 1460s he published De arte saltandi et choreas ducendi about dancing and choreography, the oldest surviving European guide on dancing. It gives instructions on various dances and also outlines what is required to be a good dancer. He identified that successful dance consisted of many techniques: an understanding of musical tempos, knowledge of the prescribed steps, manners, agility, the ability to moderate one's movements, overall control of the body, and speed. Domenico died in around 1470 in Ferrara, Northern Italy.

== See also ==
- Renaissance dance
- Italian folk dance
