= Brussels Basse Danse Manuscript =

15th-century manuscript

- Royal Library of Belgium, Brussels
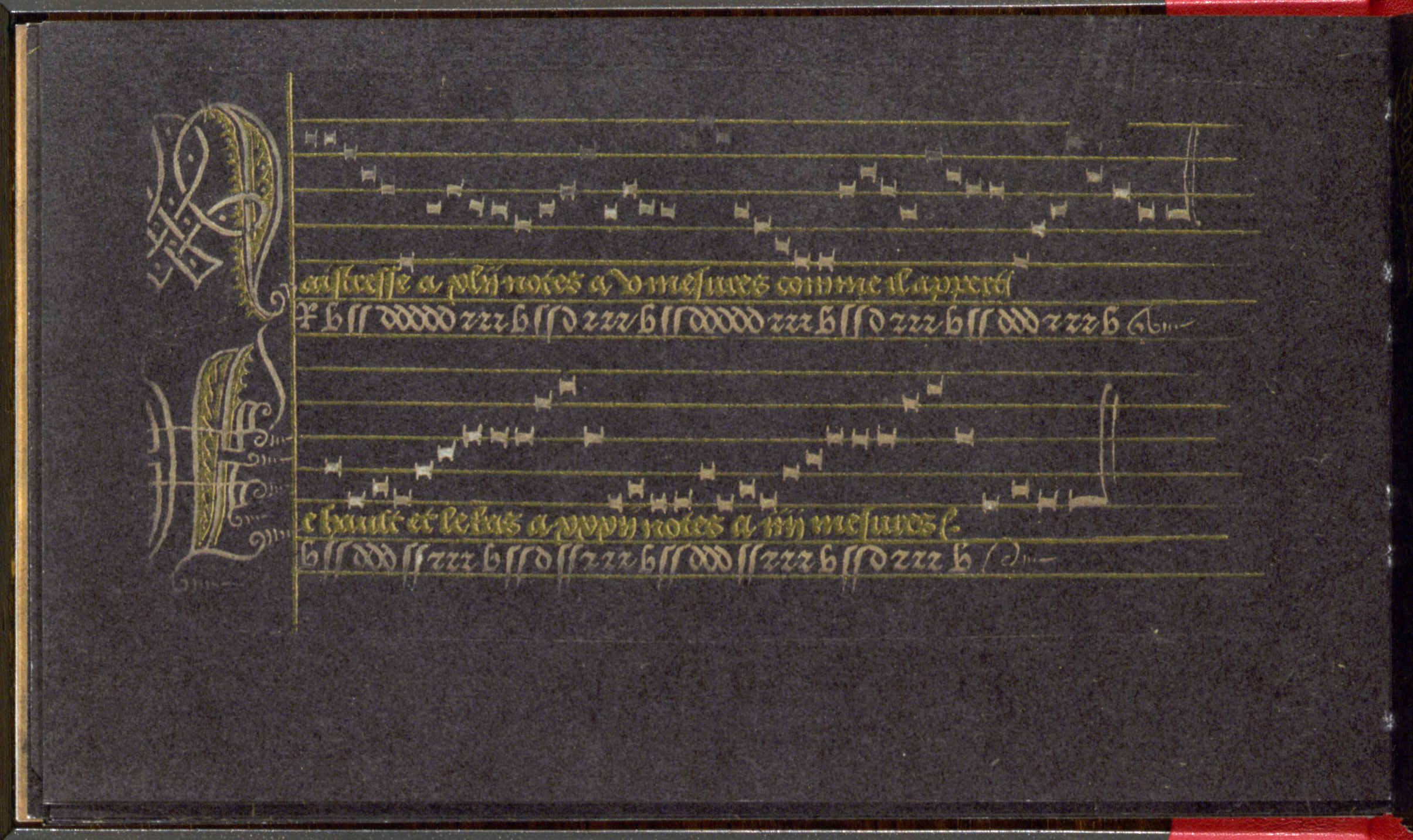
- Brussels, Royal Library of Belgium, MS9085, Folio 16
- Also known as: Basses danses dites de Marguerite d'Autriche or Brussels manuscript 9085
- Type: Manuscript
- Date: Late Fifteenth-Century
- Place of origin: Burgundian-Habsburg Netherlands
- Language: Picard (Old French dialect)
- Material: Black-dyed parchment
- Size: 12.8 × 21 cm
- Format: Presentation manuscript
- Condition: Very Fragile
- Script: lettre bourguignonne
- Contents: Treatise on the basse danse and 58 dances with musical notation

The Brussels Basse Danse Manuscript (Brussels, Bibliothèque royale de Belgique, MS 9085), also known as Basses danses dites de Marguerite d'Autriche or Brussels manuscript 9085, is a late fifteenth-century manuscript containing choreographies and music for the courtly basse danse.

The manuscript contains 25 leaves of black-dyed parchment and is written in lettre bourguignonne script using gold and silver ink. The presentation book consists of a theoretical treatise on the principles of the basse danse, followed by notated descriptions of fifty-eight dances. These notations employ abbreviated step symbols that correspond to musical notation, allowing choreography and music to be read together.

Produced within the cultural and historical context of the Burgundian-Habsburg court, the Brussels manuscript reflects the central role of dance in aristocratic ceremony and courtly display during the late fifteenth-century. Although the manuscript bears an ownership inscription attributed to Margaret of Austria, its precise dating, origins, and commission remain subjects of scholarly debate. As one of the rare surviving basse danse sources, it provides important evidence for the notation, transmission, and performance of court dance in late medieval Europe.

== Historical context ==
=== Burgundian-Habsburg court culture ===
The Brussels manuscript was produced within the late fifteenth-century Burgundian-Habsburg court, likely during the reign of Maximilian I or Philip the Fair. After the death of Charles the Bold in 1477, his daughter Mary of Burgundy (1457-1482) married the future Holy Roman Emperor Maximilian I, bringing the Burgundian Netherlands into Habsburg control. Following Mary's death, Maximilian governed the Burgundian territories, and his son Philip the Handsome (c. 1478-1506) later assumed rule. Both courts functioned as major cultural centres, continuing Burgundian traditions of display, ceremony, and patronage, including the production of illuminated manuscripts for courtly patrons.

Within this courtly environment, dance served important diplomatic and ceremonial functions. Alongside feasting, tournaments, and other forms of spectacle, court dancing reinforced social hierarchy, expressed political identity, and provided opportunities for elite interaction and display. The basse danse in particular occupied a central role in aristocratic ceremony and social performance during the later fifteenth-century. Within this context, manuscripts such as the Brussels manuscript were produced and circulated among elite courts.

=== Basse danse at court ===
Central to Burgundian court ceremony, the basse danse (French for "low dance") emerged as one of the most popular dance styles at the Burgundian-Habsburg court. Couples at court performed this elegant processional dance, characterised by controlled, gliding steps with minimal foot lifting. Musical ensembles playing instruments such as the pipe-and-tabor, the flute and drum, or the slide trumpet typically accompanied basse danses.

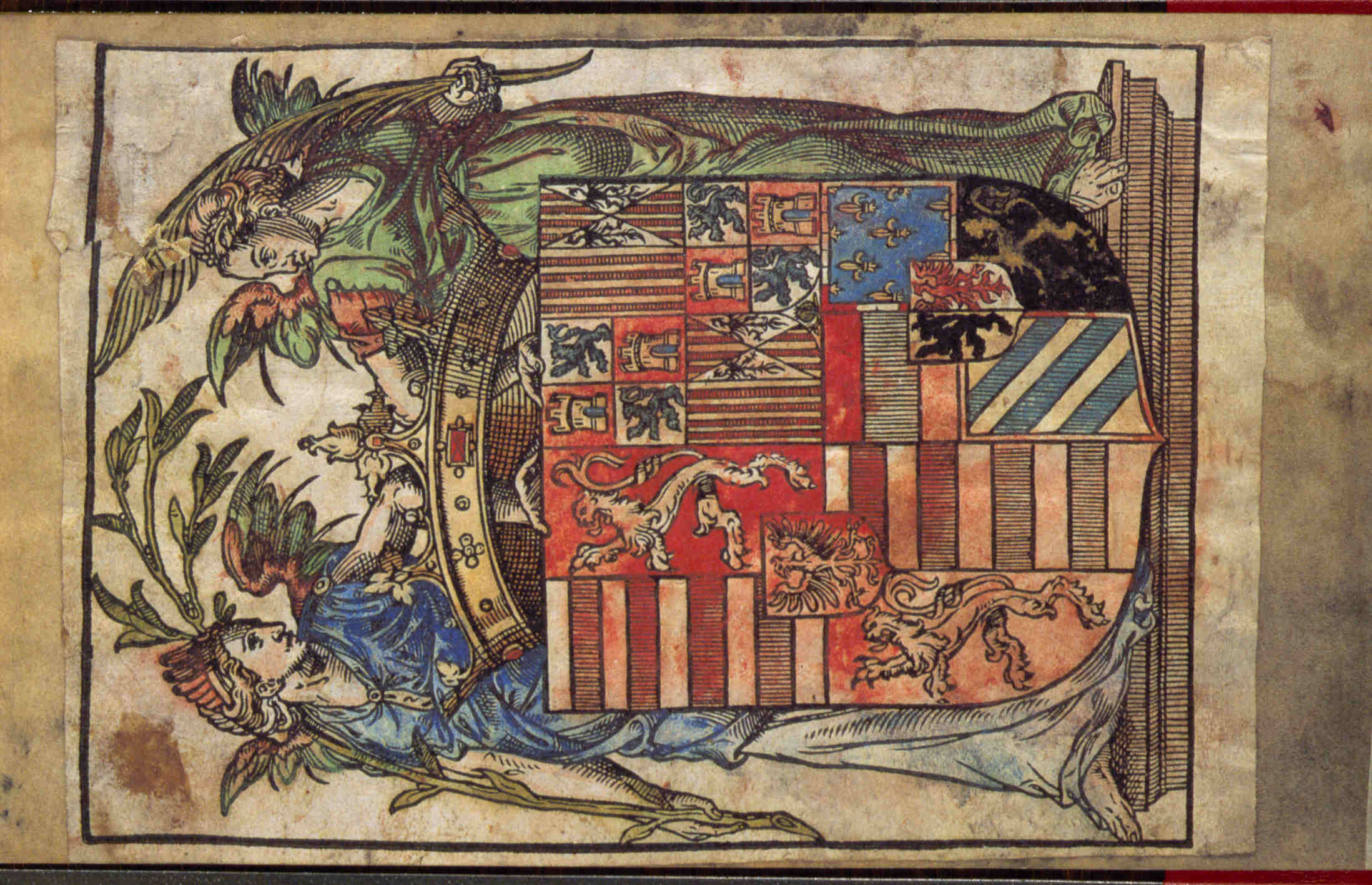
Brussels manuscript 9085 - Page 03

The dance emphasised grace, restraint, and aristocratic comportment through its prescribed choreography, which contrasted with more rustic court dances. Each basse danse had distinct choreography, requiring dancers to memorise step sequences and their corresponding musical measures. The popularity and formalisation of the basse danse in late fifteenth-century courts encouraged the production of written sources, such as the Brussels manuscript, which recorded its choreography and music as mnemonic aids for court performers.

== Manuscript description ==
=== Physical characteristics ===
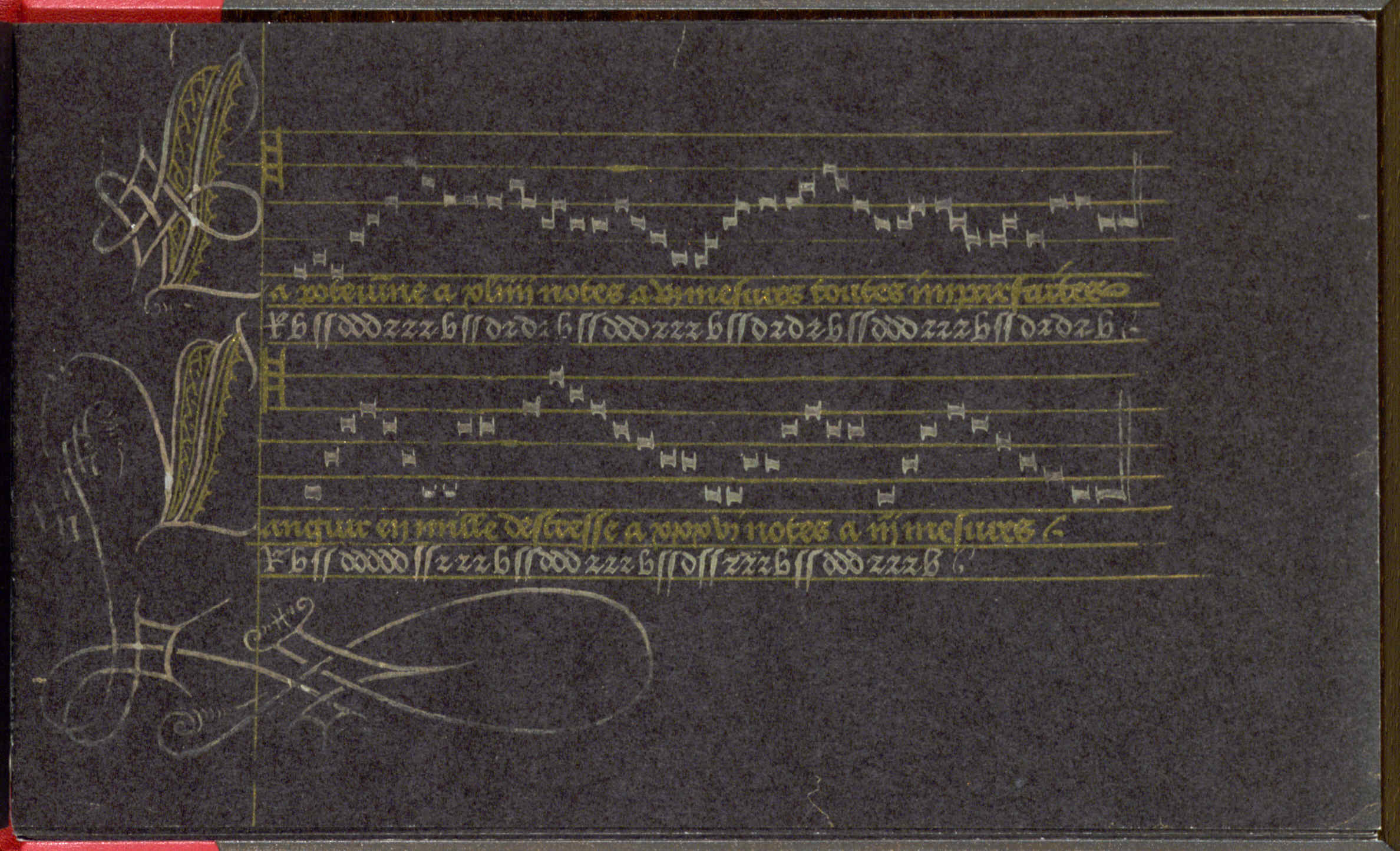
Brussels manuscript 9085 - Page 35

Now preserved in the Royal Library of Belgium (KBR), the Brussels manuscript, measuring 12.8 by 21 centimetres (5.0 in × 8.3 in), survives in its original binding of red silk-covered wooden boards. The manuscript's parchment leaves are inscribed in gold ink for the rules and silver ink for calligraphic initials. The inscriber used the elegant Burgundian court script known as lettre bourguignonne for the book's contents. This script also inscribes the front cover of the manuscript, which reads: "Plusie(urs) basse danse."

At an unknown point, the manuscript lost one of its parchment leaves and was rebound with its pages in the wrong order. The 25 remaining parchment leaves are black-dyed. Concerning this colouring, the Alamire Foundation states: "The colour of the parchment is not accidental nor casual. In the Middle Ages, black was mainly associated with class and prestige. This probably explains the colour's particular popularity at the Burgundian court." The foundation further notes that, despite the aesthetic appeal of the black colour, the dyeing process has impacted the stability of the manuscript's parchment.

=== Structure and contents ===
The manuscript is organised into two principal sections: an instructional treatise and a repertoire of dances. The opening section presents a theoretical explanation of the principles and step vocabulary of the basse danse. The text of this treatise is written in Picard, a northern French dialect. The second section contains fifty-eight dances, each accompanied by choreographic indications and monophonic musical notation. Each dance is marked by its title and number of mesures. The dances are recorded with abbreviated step symbols correlated with musical phrases, allowing movement to align with musical structure. Most accompanying melodies are monophonic ("tenors") written in long-note notation, although some employ mensural notation, introducing stylistic variations within the repertoire.

The Brussels manuscript is often compared to another surviving basse danse manuscript, Sensuit l'art et instruction de bien dancer ("Toulouze"), as the two sources share substantial textual and musical concordance. The Brussels and Toulouze manuscripts are two of only three known basse danse sources that include music, and both distinguish basse danse majeur and basse danse mineur as different choreographic types. Three dances appearing in both Brussels and Toulouze are La Beaulté de Castille, Roti boully joyeulx, and L'Esperance de Bourbon. Based on the names of dances in their repertoires, scholars generally propose that both manuscripts derive independently from a now-lost archetype circulating within Burgundian court culture. However, the books are not identical: the Brussels repertoire contains fifteen basse danses absent from Toulouze, including La Danse de Cleves and La Franchise nouvelle.

== Dance notation and transmission ==
Basse danse relied heavily on memorisation, with dancers needing to memorise the step sequences (mesures) and corresponding music for each dance. Before the appearance of written basse danse sources, performers learned choreography and music through embodied and oral instruction, as well as practice. The growing use of written musical notation in the fifteenth-century enabled the production of manuscripts that aligned choreography with musical structure. These dance books primarily functioned as mnemonic aids for repertoires circulating at court.

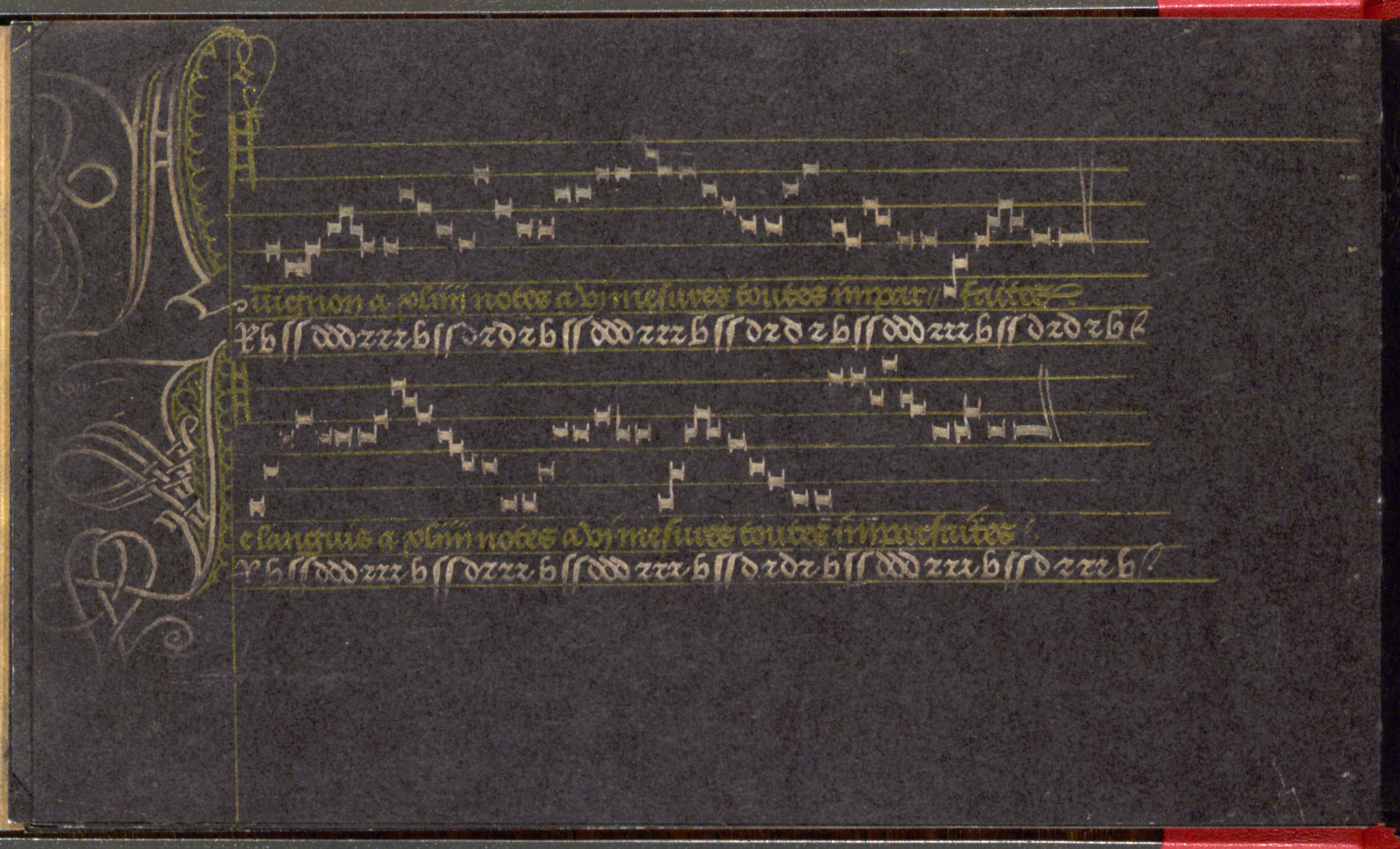
Brussels manuscript 9085 - Page 12

The Brussels manuscript transcribes the basse danses through a step vocabulary encoded with letters. According to Meg Pash, each letter represents a dance move: s for pas simple (single step), d for pas double (double step), r for desmarche/reprise, b for branle, and R for reverence. Dancers aligned these letters with their corresponding musical notes, written in long-note notation, typically consisting of black breves that end with a long. These long-note values provided a structural framework for coordinating movement and musical timing, with the written melodies likely serving as guides for dances already familiar to court musicians and dancers. Though the manuscript's repertoire primarily consists of monophonic dance tenors in the long-note format, several entries employ mensural notation instead. This variation reflects evolving methods of transmitting choreography and music in written form.

== Association with Margaret of Austria (provenance) ==
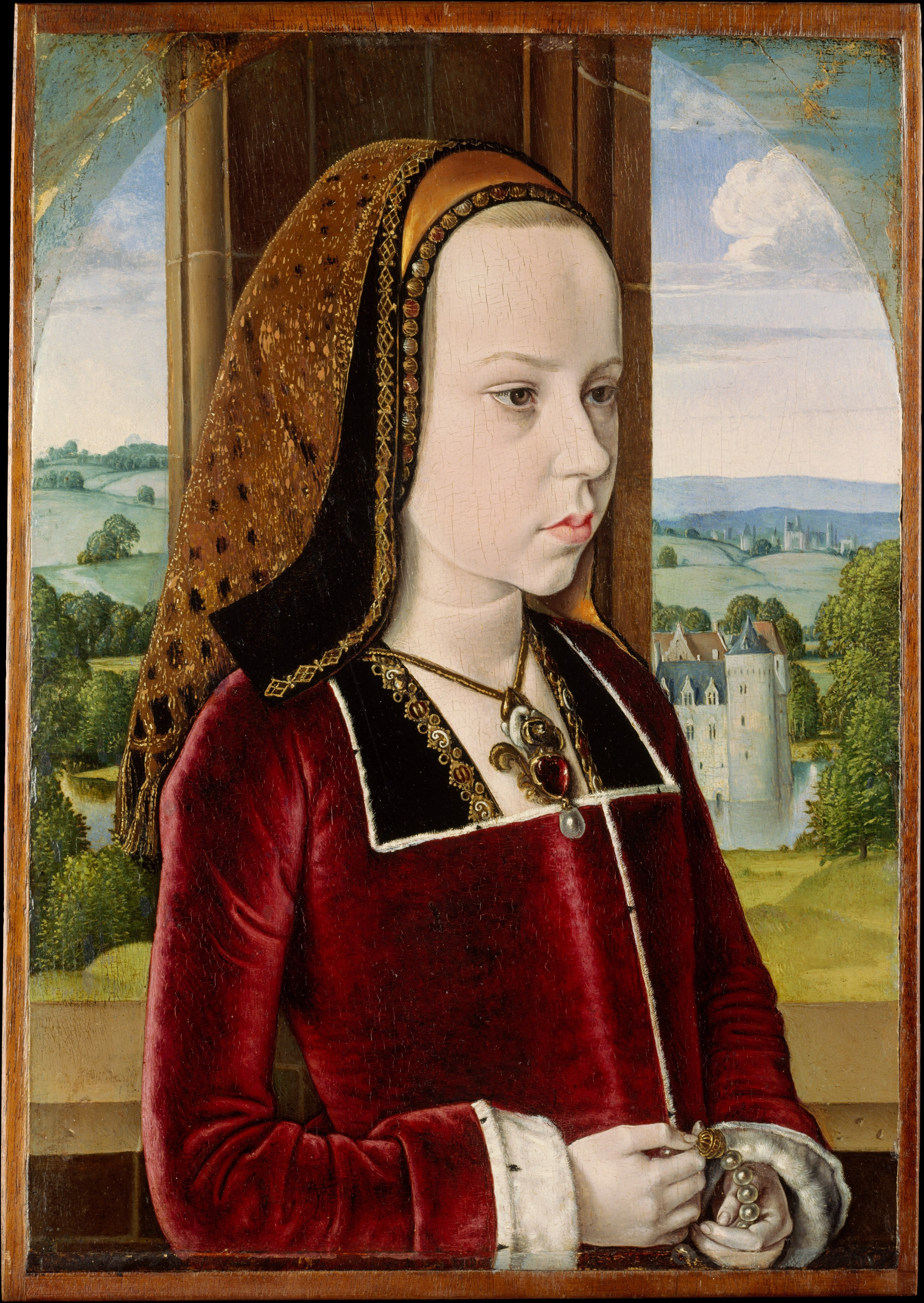
Margaret of Austria - painting by Jean Hey (called Master of Moulins) (MET, 1975.1.130)

The Brussels manuscript has long been associated with Margaret of Austria through later ownership inscriptions, although the circumstances of its original commission and early history remain uncertain. The manuscript is frequently referred to as the "dance book of Margaret of Austria", a designation reflecting her documented possession of the volume rather than confirmed patronage.

The assumption that the manuscript was produced for Margaret derives primarily from an ownership inscription referring to her. While this inscription confirms her possession of the manuscript, no surviving financial records from the Burgundian court identify when or for whom it was produced. Scholars therefore distinguish between Margaret's later ownership and the manuscript's original commission, leaving its initial patronage and dating debated. Based on internal evidence, scholars agree that it was produced in the late fifteenth-century, but exact dating estimates range from 1440 to 1497. On the basis of references to Burgundian court figures in several dance titles, some researchers have proposed alternative commissioners such as Philip of Cleves and Françoise of Luxembourg.

Evidence of the manuscript's later history indicates that it passed to Mary of Hungary following Margaret's death in 1530, as demonstrated by Mary's bookplate preserved in the volume. By this period, the basse danse repertoire was gradually becoming outdated, and the manuscript likely served more as an heirloom than as a practical dance manual. Later scholarship and modern facsimile editions reinforced the association between the manuscript and her name.

== Scholarly significance ==
The Brussels Basse Danse Manuscript is regarded as one of the most important surviving sources for the study of late medieval court dance, providing rare evidence for the notation, transmission, and performance of the basse danse. In addition to being one of the few surviving basse danse sources, the manuscript is one of only three known examples that preserve both choreography and music. This combination illustrates how dance could be recorded symbolically, aligning musical notation with movement as a mnemonic aid for trained performers and court participants.

The manuscript also reflects the cultural and political environment of the Burgundian-Habsburg court, offering insight into the role of dance in shaping aristocratic identity, ceremony, and social interaction. Questions surrounding its precise dating and original patronage remain unresolved and continue to be discussed in scholarship. The Brussels manuscript occupies a central position in modern research on medieval performance, manuscript culture, and the transmission of embodied artistic practices.

== Bibliography ==
- "The basse danse of Margaret of Austria". Alamire Foundation. 2021. Archived from the original on 11 November 2025.
- "Basses danses de Marguerite d'Autriche = [ms. 9085]". KBR: Royal Library of Belgium (in Dutch). 9 December 2025.
- Bruinsma, Eelco (1992). "The 'Lettre Bourguignonne' in Cambridge University Library Nn.3.2 and other Flemish manuscripts: a method of identification". Transactions of the Cambridge Bibliographical Society. 10 (2). Cambridge Bibliographical Society: 156–164. ISSN 0068-6611. JSTOR 41154816. OCLC 9974424097.
- Crane, Frederick (1965). "The Derivation of Some Fifteenth-Century Basse-Danse Tunes". Acta Musicologica. 37 (3/4): 179-188. doi:10.2307/932444. JSTOR 932444.
- McDonald, Grantley (2022). Brussels Basse Danse Manuscript in Context. Leuven Library of Music in Facsimile 6. Antwerp: Davidsfonds. ISBN 978-90-223-4004-2. OCLC 1443632463 – via Alamire Foundation, Leuven.
- Skjelver, Danielle Mead; Wiesflecker, Hermann (8 January 2026). "Holy Roman emperor, Biography & Legacy". Encyclopedia Britannica.
- Pash, Meg (2 September 2017). "The Brussels Manuscript: Interpreting the Fifteenth-Century Basse Danse". Dance Chronicle. 40 (3). New York: Marcel Dekker: 414–420. doi:10.1080/01472526.2017.1368344. ISSN 0147-2526. OCLC 7184771339.
- "Basses danses dites de Marguerite d'Autriche (Ms. 9085 aus dem Besitz der Bibliothèque royale Albert Ier, Bruxelles) : vollständige Faksimile-Ausgabe im Originalformat der Handschrift". The Library of Congress. 26 June 2025. LCCN 90172142.
- "The 'Basses Danses' of Margaret of Austria". VGP Foundation. Archived from the original on 21 April 2025.
- Wisse, Jacob (1 October 2002). "Burgundian Netherlands: Court Life and Patronage". The Metropolitan Museum of Art. Archived from the original on 31 January 2026.
