= Cesare Negri =

Italian dancer and choreographer

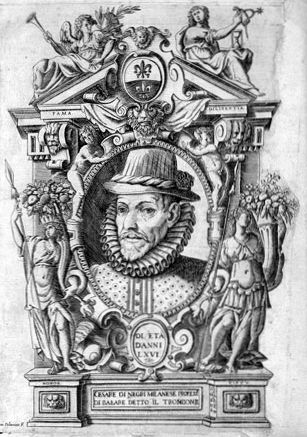
Cesare Negri, a portrait from Le Grazie d'Amore

Cesare Negri (c. 1535 – c. 1605) was an Italian dancer and choreographer. He was nicknamed il Trombone, an ugly or jocular name for someone "who likes to blow his own horn". Born in Milan, he founded a dance academy there in 1554. He was an active court choreographer for the nobility in Milan. He wrote Le Grazie d'Amore, the first text on ballet theory to expound the principle of the five basic positions. It was republished in 1604 as Nuove Inventioni di Balli (New Inventions of the Dance).

Like other masters of the time as mentioned above, Césare Negri wanted to reap the fruits of his work in a theoretical and practical treatise, so he wrote the treatise "Thanks of Love" in 1602 (La gratia d'amore) Whose second edition appeared under the title of "New Inventions of Dance", in 1604, where they describe the five fundamental positions of the academic dance.

It is a work that contains three parts, of which the second rule 55 technical rules, while in the third figure with choreographic descriptions. He is found in his new work, such as the tram, the leap of fiocó, a kind of launch made in the street: it was to touch a knot of ribbons suspended ceiling (fiocco,) with the tip of the foot During the jump Negri is The first that defends the feet in the fuore, origin of the call "in dehors". It describes steps of a technical difficulty superior and executed with greater speed, like the pirouette on a foot or the turns in the air, that the present dancers continue practising. Other steps we find in races or pranks. There are also some notions of pedagogy in the sense in which they explain that the defined steps can serve as preparation for others, and the use of a support to exercise in performing.

All these techniques described will be affected by the heavy costumes and ornaments, which make its execution impossible. This book writes it dedicating it to Philip III, King of Spain at this time. Two Spanish dances appear: Spanishito and Canario. And contains the first descriptions of dances created for a show organised with the wedding motif of the Infanta Isabel Clara Eugenia with the Archduke Albert of Austria. Names of important dancers that we find in this book son Antonio de Idiaquez, Diego de Ghivarra, Ottavia Cauenaga and Mendozza or Donna Maria Ordugna. Negri, as mentioned above, arranged, on 30 November 1598, the entry into Milan of Margaret of Austria, Queen of Spain. As also on 26 June 1574, in that same city, a masquerade of 25 entrances of floats symbolizing the states of the soul;

Later, he directed a band in the ducal place, with 82 participants of the high nobility, with allegorical and mythological subjects. These dances are performed by a variable number of performers; We met a couple, a trio, two ladies and two gentlemen, three couples, four gentlemen and four ladies and an indefinite number of artists. Some of them are built in an alternation of musical rhythms: Pavan, vigorous, ratchet and canary, where a slow and solemn step is alternated with great inventiveness and originality at faster and more animated steps, where most of the dancers perform A good show

The common characteristics of these treatments are explanations and rules for the performance of dances and social behaviour that should be observed by the whole knight or lady, including rules descriptions of the steps with their possible variants, a detailed explanation of the dances preceded Of an illustration and dedication, including the musical score.

Cesare Negri composed Bianco Fiore for lute, a famous piece for the interpretation and transcription of the guitarist Andres Segovia.Bianco Fiore by Cesare Negri, played by Daniele Magli ( YouTube video )

== See also ==
- Italian folk dance

== Bibliography ==
- Negri, Cesare. Nuove Inventioni di Balli. Milan: G. Bordone, 1604. Facsimile of original available from Library of Congress: Dance Instruction Manuals
- Kendall, G. Yvonne. "Le Gratie d'Amore 1602 by Cesare Negri: Translation and Commentary." Stanford University PhD Thesis, 1985. 2 vols.
- McGinnis, Katherine Tucker. "Your Most Humble Subject, Cesare Negri Milanese." In Dance, Spectacle, and the Body Politick, 1250-1750, edited by Jennifer Nevile, 211-228. Indiana University Press, 2008. ISBN 978-0-253-21985-5

== External resources ==
- Nvove Inventioni di Balli From the Collections at the Library of Congress
- The Nuove Inventioni di Balli in digital lute tablature (Fronimo, PDF and MIDI formats)
- Ángel Manuel Olmos: Papeles Barbieri - Tratado de danza de Cesare Negri
