= Guglielmo Ebreo da Pesaro =

Jewish Italian dancer (c. 1420–c. 1484)

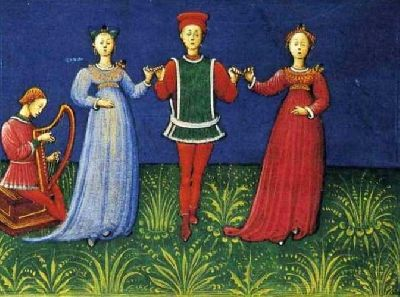
Manuscript image from De pratica seu arte tripudii

Guglielmo Ebreo da Pesaro (c. 1420 – c. 1484) was a Jewish Italian dancer and dancing master at some of the most influential courts in Renaissance Italy, including Naples, Urbino, Milan, and Ferrara. His byname Ebreo means simply ‘Hebrew.’ Not always used when referring to him, da Pesaro indicates that he was from the east-central town of Pesaro. Between October 1463 and May 1465, Guglielmo probably converted from Judaism to Roman Catholicism and took the name Giovanni Ambrosio.

He studied with Domenico da Piacenza (sometimes known as Domenico da Ferrara) in the 1440s, and is mentioned in Domenico's Liber ballorum (1460).

Around 1463, Guglielmo authored the treatise De pratica seu arte tripudii (On the Practice or Art of Dancing), sometimes cited as Trattato dell' arte del ballare (Treatise on the Art of Dancing). In it, Guglielmo defends dancing as a noble art, emphasizing the important role of music. He also describes qualities necessary for dancers, including posture, musicality, style, and memory, and provides first-hand accounts of massive court celebrations in which he played a role. The treatise contains choreographies and music for thirty-six dances by Guglielmo and his contemporaries.

== Conversion to Roman Catholicism ==
Between 1463 and 1465 Guglielmo was baptized and took the name of Giovanni Ambrogio. His patron and friend Alessandro Sforza (Lord of Pesaro and brother of Francesco Sforza) convinced Guglielmo to convert to Roman Catholicism. Alessandro Sforza was a very religious man, but perhaps also influenced Guglielmo's ability to access the dignity of Knight.

In 1469 Guglielmo became a Knight of the Golden Spur, as had his teacher Domenico da Piacenza.

In honour of Alessandro Sforza's daughter, Ginevra, Guglielmo composed a bassadanza in due. In 1465 he moved to Milan, where he was in charge of the celebrations for the wedding of Eleonora d'Aragona with the Duke of Bari.

== See also ==
- Italian folk dance
