= Antonio Cornazzano =

Italian poet, writer, biographer, and dancing master (c. 1430–1484)

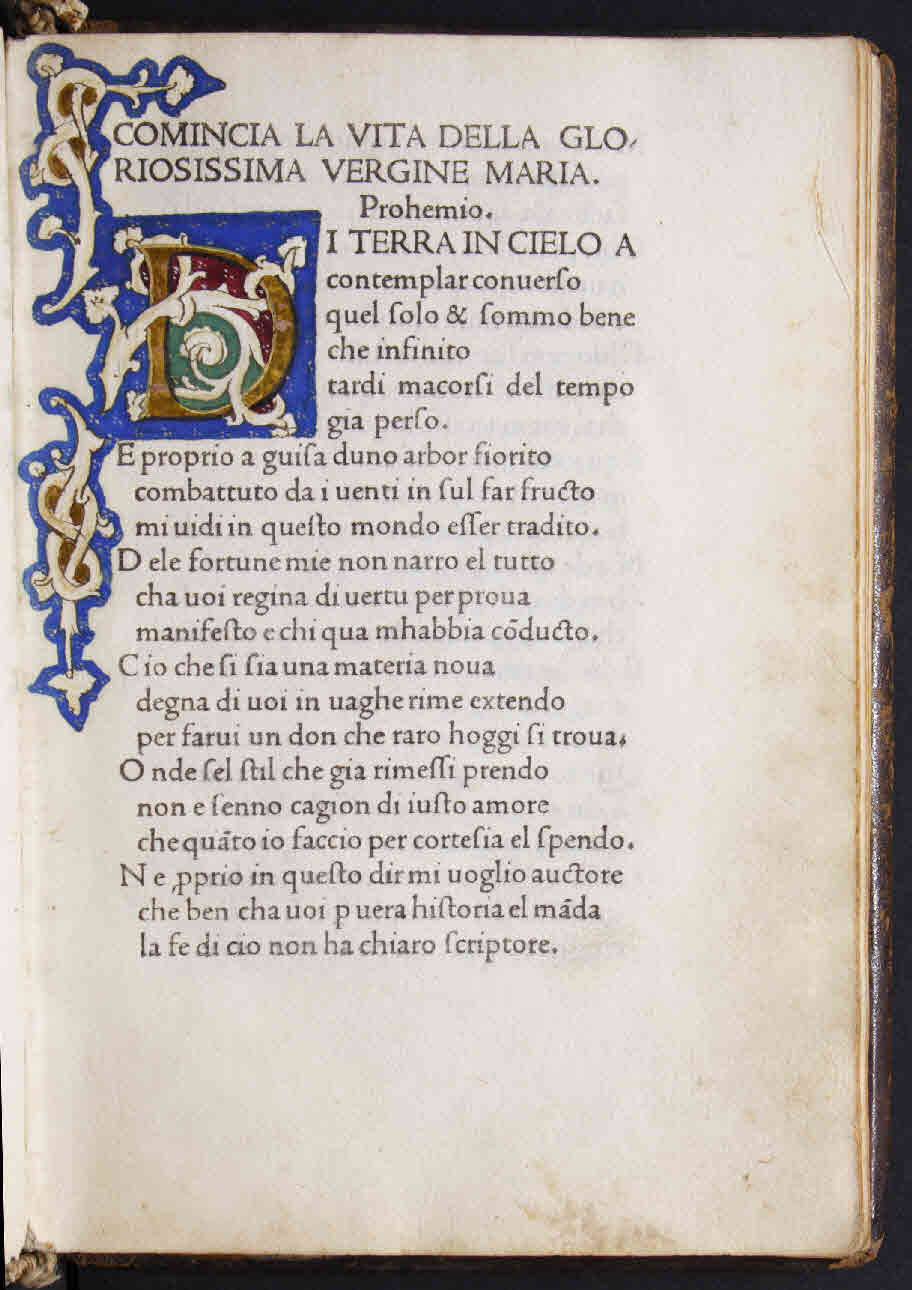
Vita della gloriosissima Vergine Maria, 1471

Antonio Cornazzano (c. 1430 in Piacenza – 1484 in Ferrara) was an Italian poet, writer, biographer, and dancing master.

== Biography ==
In the city of Piacenza, which was then in the Duchy of Milan, Antonio Cornazzano was born probably in 1432. His father, Bonifacio Cornazzano was a well-known lawyer and his mother, Costanza Bagarotti, belonged to the small nobility from Piacentine territory. Cornazzano studied at the university of Siena between 1444 and 1447, and in 1450 he was in Rome, probably in the service of a high prelate. He then found his way to Milan in 1455, where he served Duke Francesco Sforza, and wrote a long poem in praise of the Duke, his 'De gestis Francisci Sfortiae' or 'Sforziade'. He also wrote a small treatise on the art of dancing, a life of the Virgin Mary and a Latin scurrilous collection of 'novellae' "De proverbiorum origine". After attending the Duke's funeral in 1466, he left Milan. He moved to Venetian territory and, for a time, worked with the condottiere Bartolomeo Colleoni, whose biography Cornazzano wrote in Latin. In Venice, he worked with the printer Nicolas Jenson, and published a "Life of Christ". In 1475, he moved to the court of Ferrara, where he wrote important works; a short treatise on government, and one on military art (c. 1476) in prose. He later turned the latter into a terza rima poem. He died in Ferrara in 1484. Via Antonio Cornazzano in Piacenza is named after him.

== Poetry ==
There is a manuscript in the Estense Library in Modena, Italy, written in 15th or 16th century script. It contains four poetic Italian works by Corazzano in terza rima- a form of stanza that requires a set of three lines that rhyme. Terza rima was first used by Italian Dante Alighieri. Of the four works, three were published, along with a number of his poems in the same style. The title of Opera nova were given to these selections published in 1517 and 1518. Of Cornazzano's four works mentioned above, one, the first of the series,De mulieribus admirandis, was never published (but see C. FAHY, "The 'De mulieribus admirandis' of Antonio Cornazzano" in LA BIBLIOFILIA, 52 (1960) pp. 144–174). It, in fact, has grown in obscurity over the many years since its creation until it has nearly been wiped from history's rich pages. It has even received little, if any attention from the scholarly men of Italy. (The above is rather sketchy) for accurate, reliable and scholarly information,

See: R.L. BRUNI and D. ZANCANI, Antonio Cornazzano: La tradizione testuale, Florence, Olschki 1992.

There is another article in English on Cornazzano, apart from Fahy's, by D. ZANCANI, 'Antonio Cornazzano's "De l'integrita' de la militare arte"', in "Chivalry in the Renaissance, ed. by S. Anglo, Woodbridge, Boydell 1990, pp. 13–24.

== Dancing ==
Cornazzano's dancing master was Domenico da Piacenza, who was perhaps better known as Domenico da Ferrara. Cornazzano was a fellow student with Guglielmo Ebreo. He once said this concerning his dancing master, he is the king of the art. Cornazzano published his Libro dell'arte del danzare in 1455 a treatise on dancing in the 15th century.

See.: R.L. BRUNI and D. Zancani 'Antonio Cornazzano: Latradizione testuale', Florence: Olschki, 1992.

== See also ==
- Italian folk dance
