= Index of Renaissance articles =

This is an alphabetical index of articles related to the Renaissance.

== 0-9 ==
1400s in art = 1500 in art

== A ==
Académie de musique et de poésie - Accademia degli Infiammati - Accademia Filarmonica di Verona - Accademia Fiorentina - Age of Discovery - Air de cour - Aldine Press - Allegory in Renaissance literature - Allemande - Almain rivet - Andalusian cadence - Antwerp Mannerism - Antwerp school - Arquebus - Ars historica - Art patronage of Julius II - Artists of the Tudor court

== B ==
Ballo - Baluster - Bardini Gardens - Basse danse - Bastion fort - Bicinium - Bolognese School - Bolognese Swordsmanship - Bonfire of the vanities - Brancacci Chapel - Branchwork - Brick Renaissance - Broken consort - Brussels tapestry - Burgonet - Burgundian School

== C ==
Camera degli Sposi - Canary dance - Cangiante - Cantore al liuto - Capriccio (art) - Carmen figuratum - Carnival song - Carracks black sword - Catherine de' Medici's building projects - Catherine de' Medici's court festivals - Catherine de' Medici's patronage of the arts - Centrifugal pump - Certosina - Chamber of rhetoric - Chariot clock - Châteaux of the Loire Valley - Chiaroscuro - Chinese porcelain in European painting - Christian Humanism - Cinquecento - Cinquedea - The Civilization of the Renaissance in Italy - Classical republicanism - Colascione - Commesso - Consort of instruments - Consort song - Continuity thesis - Copernican heliocentrism - Copernican Revolution - Cordial (medicine) - Cornamuse - Corseque - Cortile del Belvedere - Courante - Court painter - Cresset - Cross-strung harp - Crumhorn - Cultural references to Leonardo da Vinci - Culverin - Cutwork - Cyclic mass - Czech Renaissance architecture

== D ==
Dancing mania - Danube school - Dardanelles Gun - David (Donatello) - De pictura - De re aedificatoria - Demi-culverin - Desco da parto - Diamond vault - Donor portrait - Drawing room - Dutch and Flemish Renaissance painting - Dutch gable - Dutch Renaissance and Golden Age literature

== E ==
Early Netherlandish painting - Elizabethan and Jacobean furniture - Elizabethan architecture - Elizabethan era - Elizabethan leisure - Elizabethan literature - English Madrigal School - English Renaissance - English Renaissance theatre - Estoc - Europa regina - European colonization of the Americas -

== F ==
Fall of Constantinople - Figura serpentinata - Flame-bladed sword - Flemish painting - Florence - Florentine Camerata - Florentine citron - Florentine painting - Florin - Folly (allegory) - Forlivese school of art - Franco-Flemish School - French Renaissance - French Renaissance architecture - French Renaissance literature - Fresco - Frottola

== G ==
Gallery of Sistine Chapel ceiling - Galliard - Gardens of the French Renaissance - Gavotte - Geohumoral theory - German Renaissance - Ghent-Bruges school - Ghisi Shield - Giant order - Gnome - Gobelins Manufactory - Gothic boxwood miniature - Grand manner - Grands rhétoriqueurs - Greek scholars in the Renaissance - Greenwich armour - Guldengroschen

== H ==
Halberd - Hand cannon - Harpsichord - Harpsichord-viola - Hedge maze - Henry II style - Herrerian style - High Renaissance - Hispano-Flemish style - Hispano-Moresque ware - History of science in the Renaissance - Holbein carpet - Hours of James IV of Scotland - Hours of Lorenzo de' Medici - House of Borgia - House of Medici - House of Sforza - Humanism in France - The Hunt of the Unicorn

== I ==
I quattro libri dell'architettura - Ideal city - Ideal town - Illusionism (art) - Illusionistic ceiling painting - Imprimatura - Incunable - Intercolumniation - Intermedio - Isenheim Altarpiece - Italian city-states - Italian Renaissance - Italian Renaissance domes - Italian Renaissance garden - Italian Renaissance interior design - Italian Renaissance painting - Italian Wars

== J ==
Jacobean architecture - Jewel of Vicenza - Jig - Jousting

== K ==
Katzbalger - Kepler's laws of planetary motion - Knot garden - Koncerz

== L ==
Landsknecht - Lantern shield - The Last Judgment - The Last Supper - Laurentian Library - Legal humanists - Leonardeschi - Leonardo da Vinci - Leonardo's robot - Libro de' Disegni - Limoges enamel - Lira da braccio - Little Masters - Lives of the Most Excellent Painters, Sculptors, and Architects - Lochaber axe - Lombard (gun) - Long gallery - Longsword - Lotto carpet - Lublin Renaissance - Lucan portrait of Leonardo da Vinci Lucerne hammer - Lute song

== M ==
Madia (furniture) - Madrigal - Madrigal comedy - Madrigale spirituale - Maiolica - Mannerism - Mannerist architecture and sculpture in Poland - Mariner's astrolabe - Mascherata - Maximilian armour - Medical Renaissance - Mensural notation - Messer (weapon) - Michelangelo - Michelangelo and the Medici - Millefleur - Monster of Ravenna - Moresca - Moresche - Moresque - Motet - Motet-chanson - Museo Nazionale Scienza e Tecnologia Leonardo da Vinci - Music in the Elizabethan era - Musica reservata - Musique mesurée - Musket

== N ==
Natural magic - Neostoicism - New Learning - Northern Mannerism - Northern Renaissance

== O ==
Oil painting - Oriental carpets in Renaissance painting - Ostrich Egg Globe - Overdoor - Ovetari Chapel

== P ==
Palazzo Chiericati - Palladian architecture - Palladian villas of the Veneto - Palmanova - Paragone - Paraphrase mass - Paris in the 16th century - Parody mass - Pastel - Pastiglia - Pastrana Tapestries - Pavane - Pazzi conspiracy - Period eye - Personal life of Leonardo da Vinci - Perspective - Petrarchan sonnet - Piano nobile - Picaresque novel - Pietra dura - Pietra serena - Pike (weapon) - Pinxit - Piva (dance) - Plackart - Plaquette - Plate armour - Plateresque - Platonic Academy (Florence) - Platonism in the Renaissance - Pléiade - Poignard - Polymath - Polyphony - Polyptych - Ponte Vecchio, Bassano - Portrait painting in Scotland - Portuguese Renaissance - Prestezza - Primavera (Botticelli) - Printing press - Prodigy house - Pseudo-Kufic - Purism (Spanish architecture) - Putto

== Q ==
Quattrocento -

== R ==
Rackett - Raphael - Raphael Cartoons - Raphael Rooms - Rebec - Recitative - Reichsthaler - Rapier - Relazione - Renaissance - Renaissance architecture - Renaissance architecture in Central and Eastern Europe - Renaissance architecture in Portugal - Renaissance architecture of Toulouse - Renaissance art - Renaissance castle in Galanta - Renaissance dance - Renaissance humanism - Renaissance humanism in Northern Europe - Renaissance in Croatia - Renaissance in Poland - Renaissance in Scotland - Renaissance in the Low Countries - Renaissance Latin - Renaissance literature - Renaissance magic - Renaissance music - Renaissance Papacy - Renaissance philosophy - Renaissance reenactment - Renaissance Revival architecture - Renaissance Studies - Renaissance technology - Ribauldequin - Ricercar - Road of Weser Renaissance - Rodeleros - Roman Renaissance - Roman School - Romanism (painting) - Rondel dagger - Roof lantern - Rustication (architecture)

== S ==
Sackbut - Sacra conversazione - Saint-Porchaire ware - Sala dei Cento Giorni - Saltarello - San Giorgio Maggiore (church), Venice - Sassetti Chapel - Schlüsselfelder Ship - The School of Athens - School of Ferrara - School of Fontainebleau - The School of Night - Science and inventions of Leonardo da Vinci - Scientific Revolution - Scottish Renaissance painted ceilings - Scottish Royal tapestry collection - Sculpture in the Renaissance Period - Scythe sword - Sforza Hours - Sforzinda - Sfumato - Sgabello - Sgraffito - William Shakespeare - Shakespearean comedy - Shakespearean dance - Shakespearean history - Shakespeare's plays - Shakespearean tragedy - Sienese School - Sigismund's Chapel - Signoria - Signoria of Florence - Signoria of Venice - Sinopia - Sistine Chapel - Sistine Chapel ceiling - Snaplock - Soggetto cavato - Souterliedekens - Spada da lato - Spalliera - Spanish Golden Age - Spanish Renaissance - Spanish Renaissance architecture - Spanish Renaissance literature - St. Peter's Basilica - Stiletto - Stipo a bambocci - Strapwork - Strolling players - Studiolo of the Palazzo Belfiore - Summa de arithmetica - Swedish Reformation and Renaissance literature - Swiss dagger - Swiss degen - Swiss Guard - Swiss mercenaries

== T ==
Tapestry - Tarot - Teatro Olimpico - Tercio - Text declamation - Theatrum Orbis Terrarum - Themes in Italian Renaissance painting - Tiento - Tondo (art) - Tornabuoni Chapel - Tourdion - Transition from Renaissance to Baroque in instrumental music - Trattato della pittura - Trecento - The Triumph of Fame - Tudor architecture - Tudor period - Tuileries Garden - Tuileries Palace - Tuscan order

== U ==
Underdrawing - Underpainting - Unione

== V ==
Valois Tapestries - Vatican loggias - Venetian painting - Venetian Patent Statute - Venetian polychoral style - Venetian red - Venetian Renaissance - Venetian Renaissance architecture - Venetian School (music) - Venetian window - Vihuela - Villa Capra "La Rotonda" - Villa Cornaro - Villa d'Este - Villancico - Villanella - Viol - Viola organista - Virelai - Virginals - Vitruvian Man - Volta (dance)

== W ==
Waddesdon Bequest - Wars of the Roses - Wernigerode Armorial - Weser Renaissance - Wet-on-wet - William Shakespeare - Word painting

== Z ==
Zweihänder

== Lists ==
Commentators on Aristotle - Composers - English Renaissance composers - English Renaissance theatres - Figures - Humanists - Structures - Works by Leonardo da Vinci

== See also ==
- Medieval renaissances
- Outline of the Renaissance
