= List of Renaissance figures =

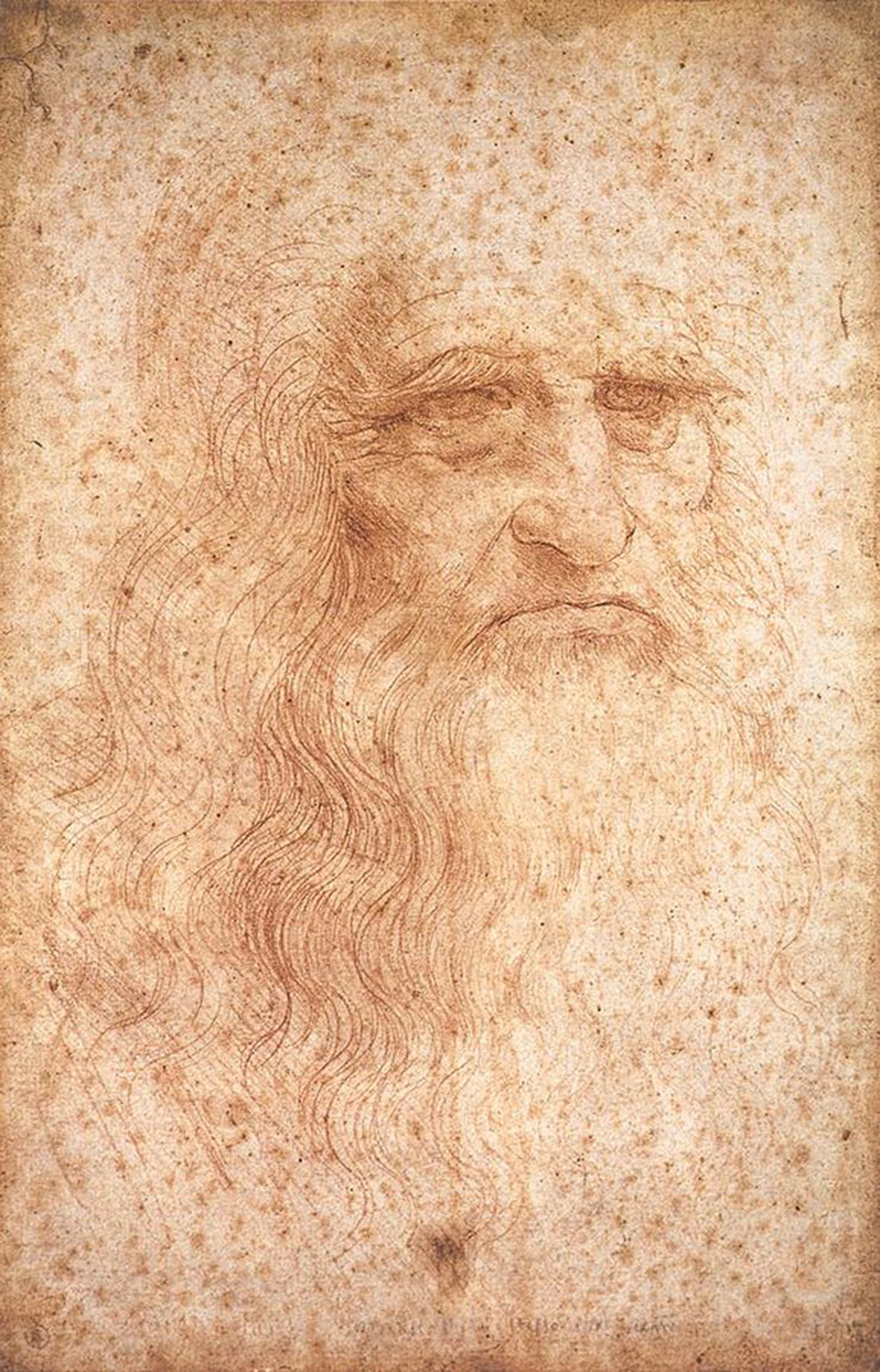
Leonardo da Vinci, the archetype of the Renaissance man

This is a list of notable people associated with the Renaissance.

== Artists and architects ==
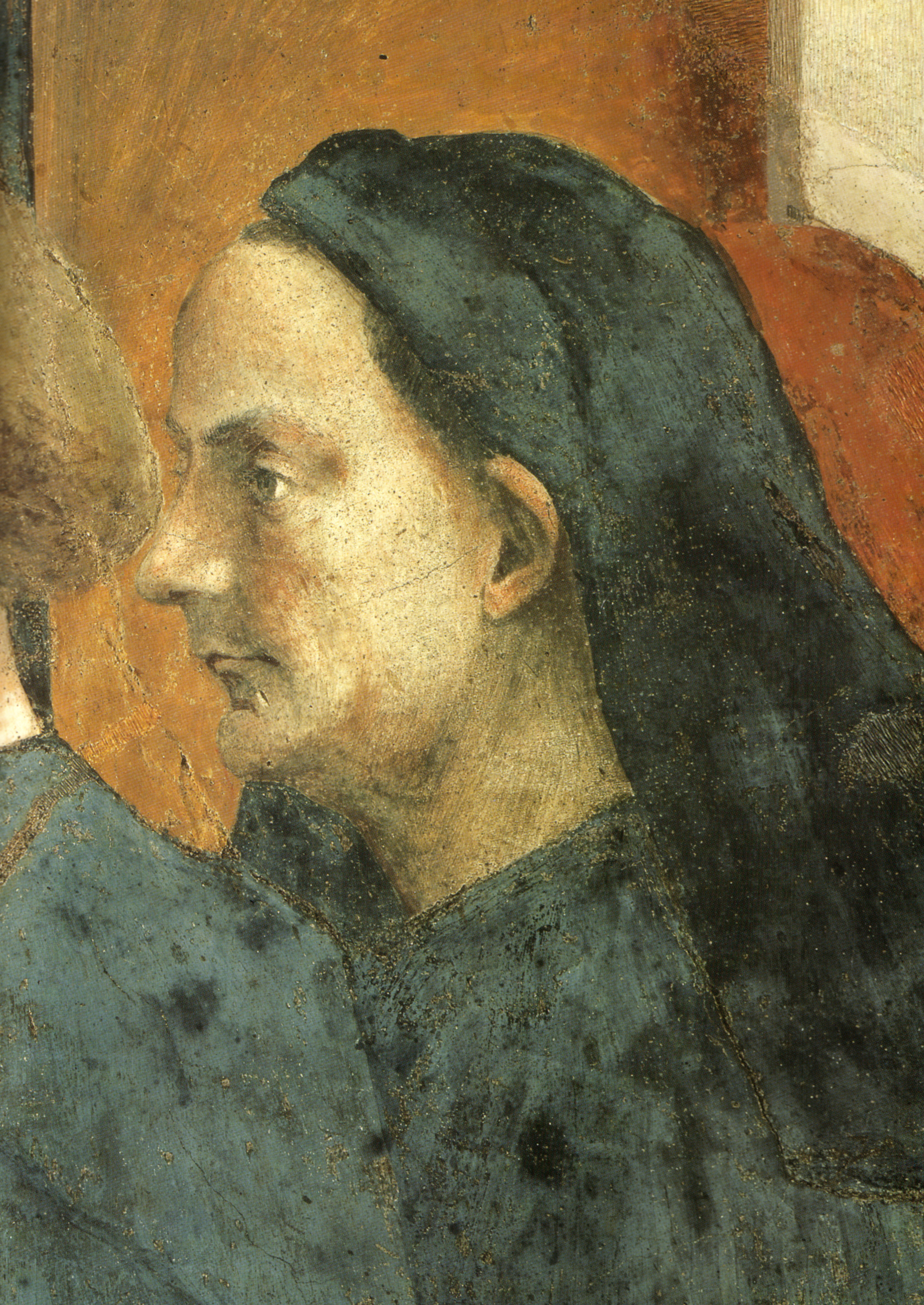
Filippo Brunelleschi

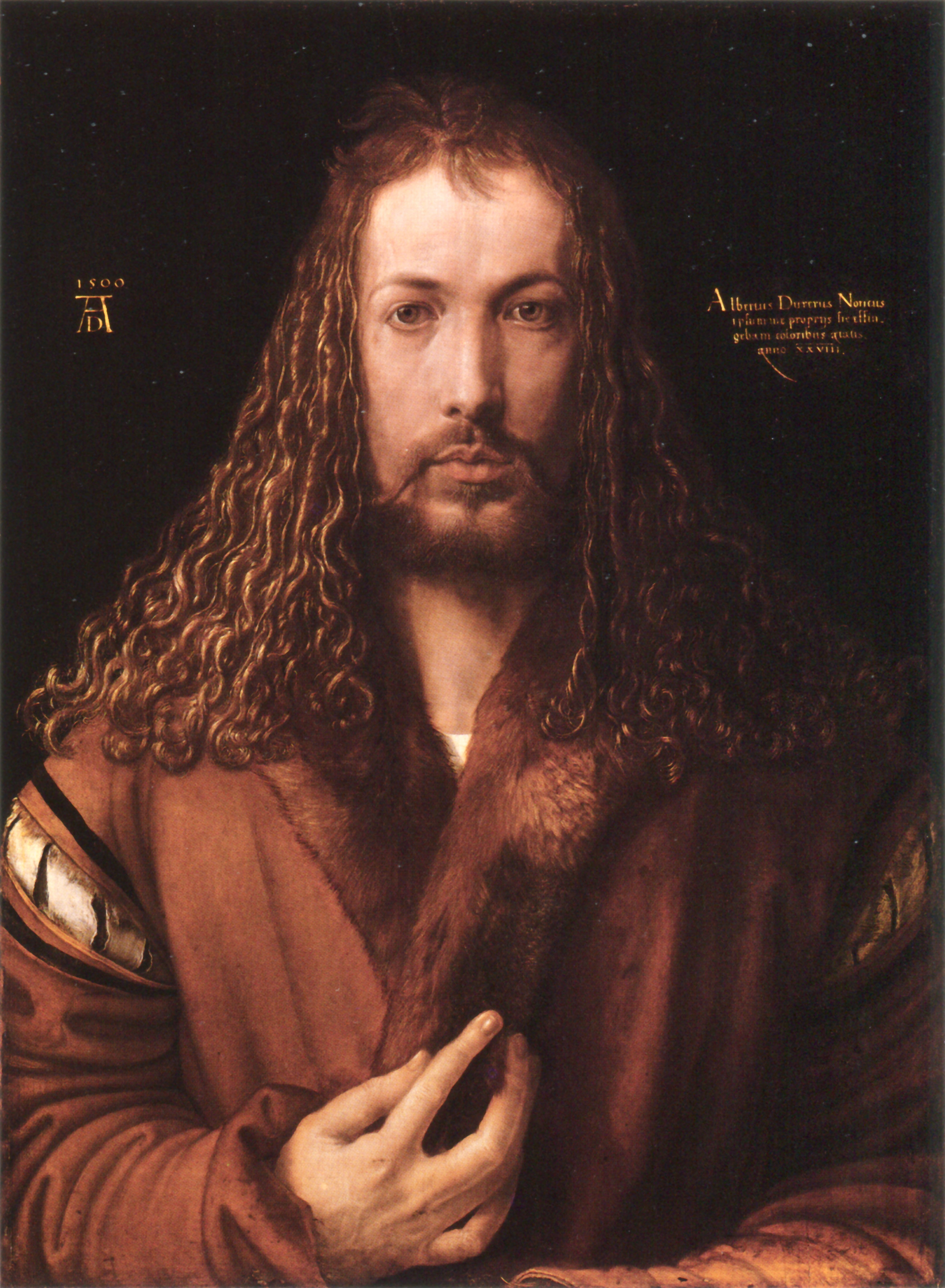
Albrecht Dürer

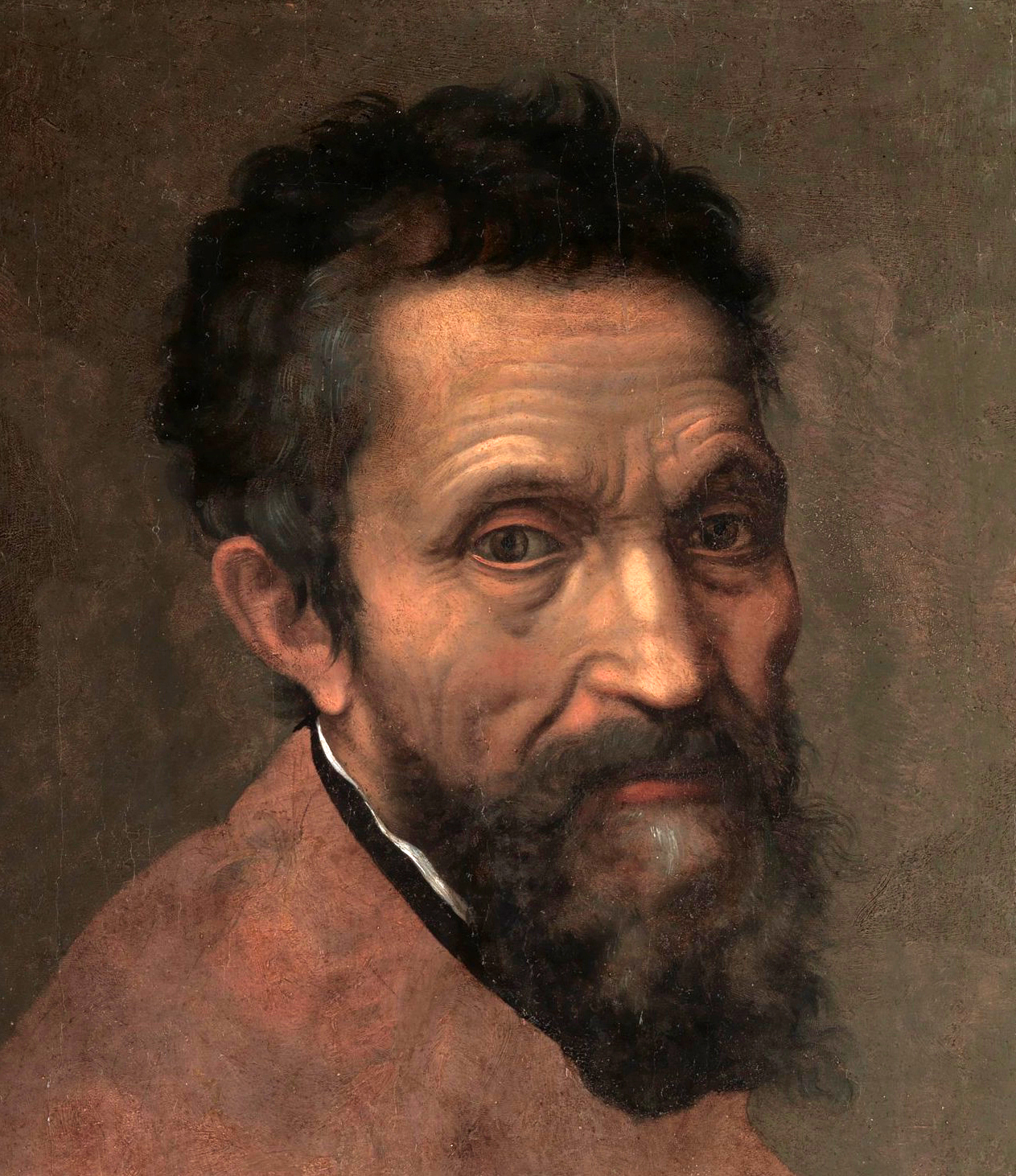
Michelangelo

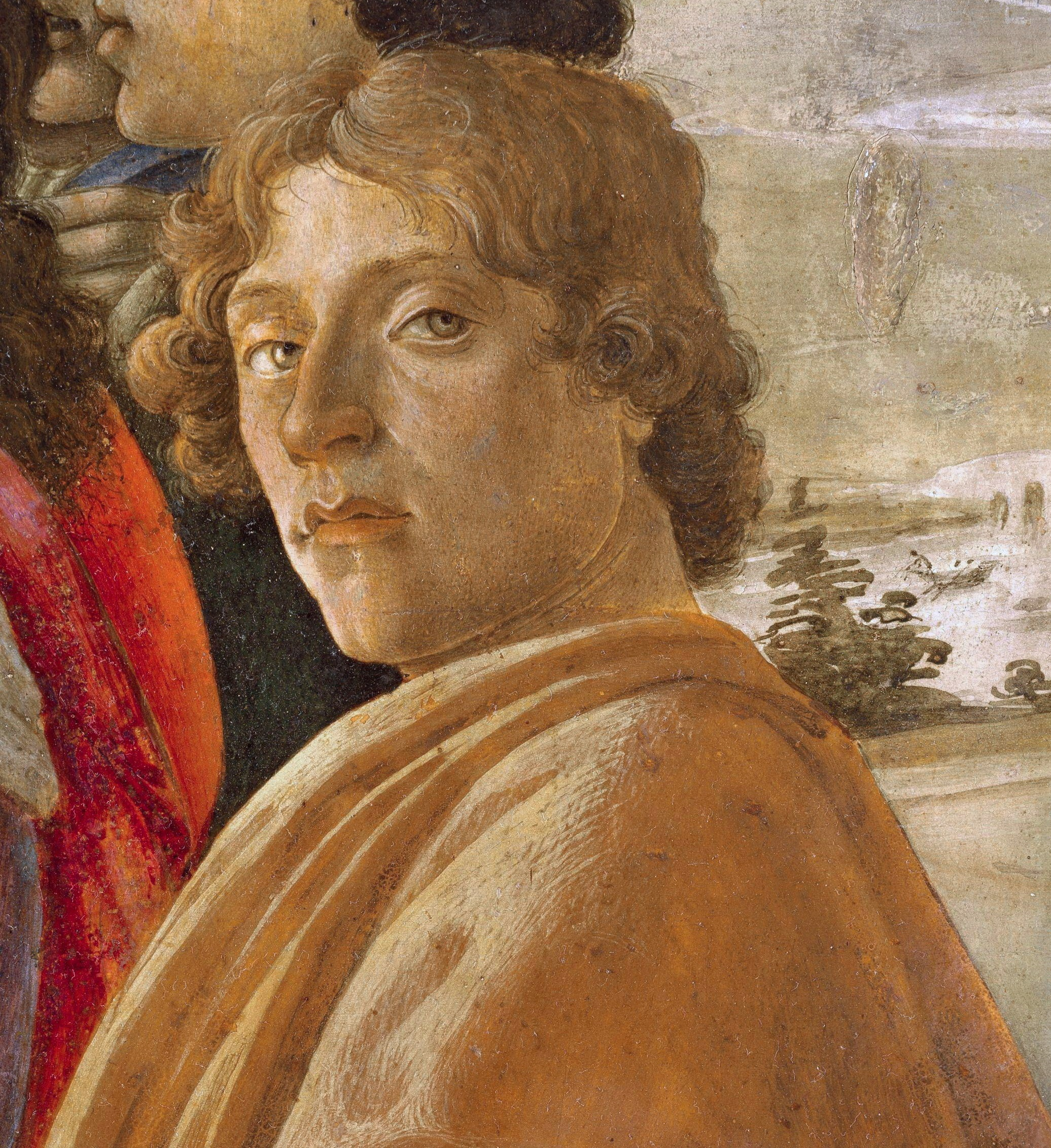
Sandro Botticelli

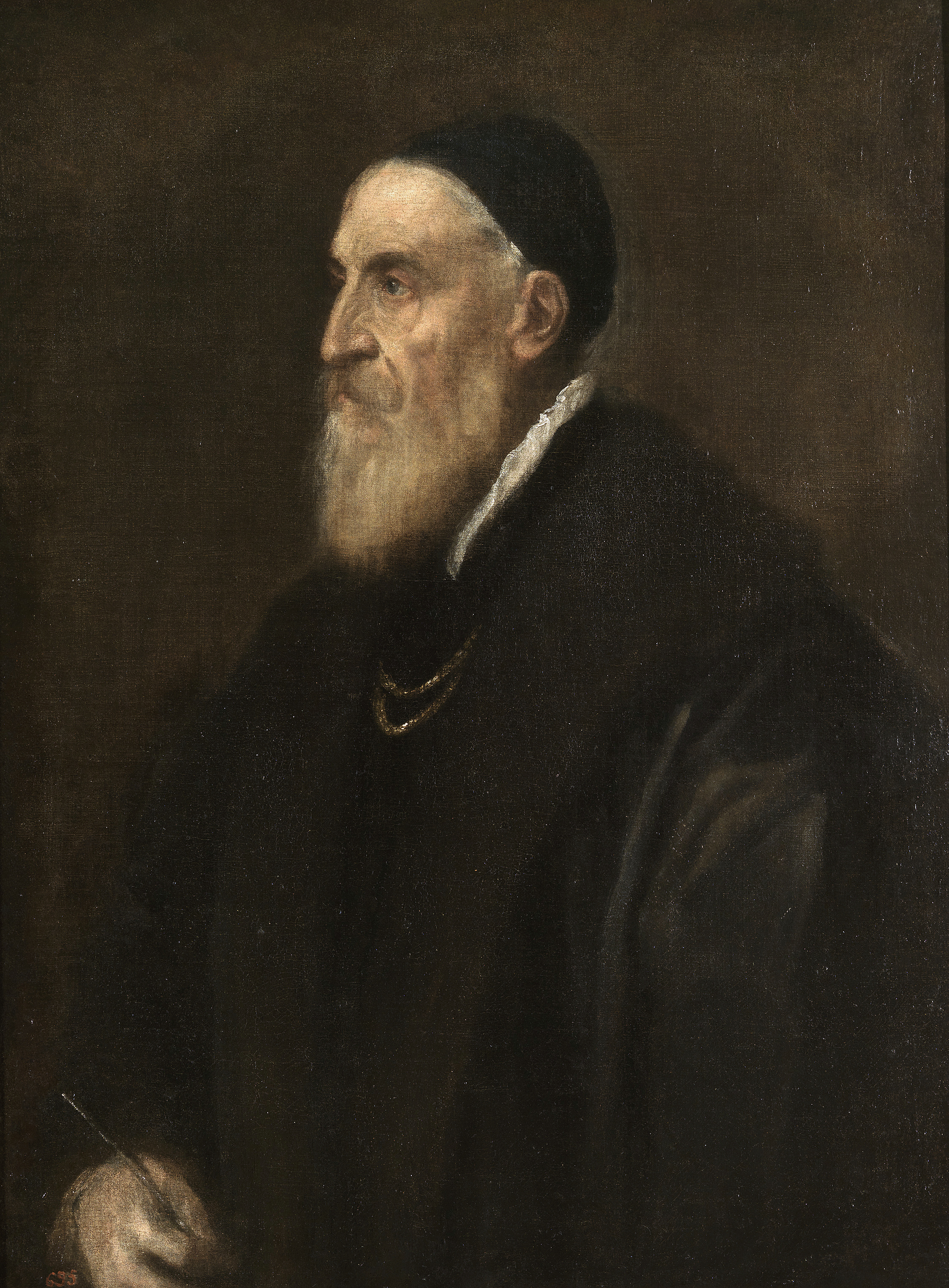
Titian

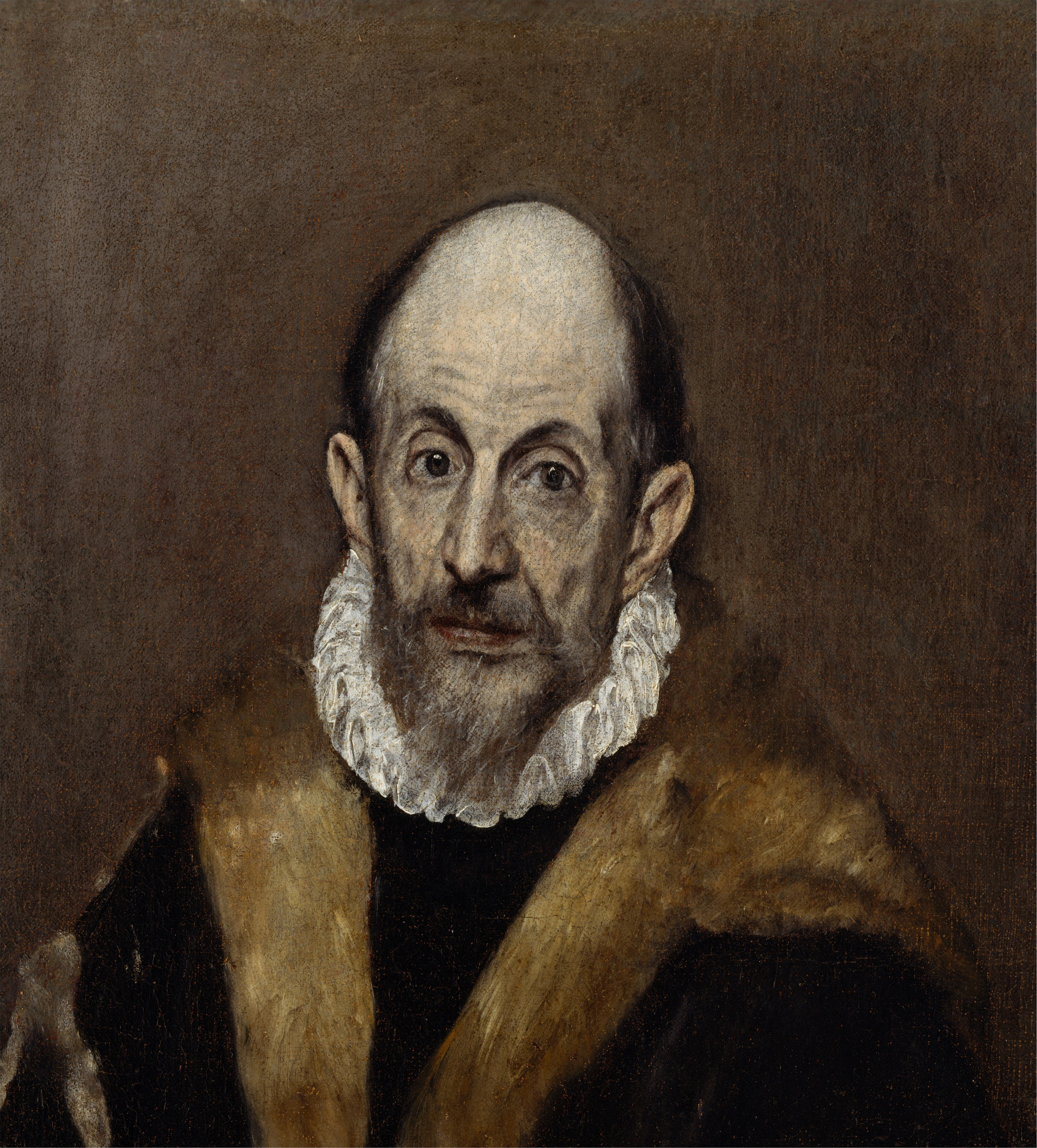
El Greco

- Sofonisba Anguissola
- Lavinia Fontana
- Artemisia gentileschi
- Albrecht Altdorfer
- Bartolommeo Berrecci
- Jean Bullant
- Agnolo Bronzino
- Pieter Brueghel the Elder
- Pieter Brueghel the Younger
- Jan Brueghel the Younger
- Filippo Brunelleschi
- Marco Cardisco
- Juan de Castillo
- Androuet du Cerceau
- Jean Clouet
- François Clouet
- Colantonio
- Lucas Cranach the Elder
- Lucas Cranach the Younger
- Philibert Delorme
- Donatello
- Albrecht Dürer
- Hans Dürer
- Jean Fouquet
- Rosso Fiorentino
- Francesco Fiorentino
- Piero della Francesca
- Marcus Gheeraerts
- Lorenzo Ghiberti
- Leonardo da Vinci
- Domenico Ghirlandaio
- Giuliano da Sangallo
- Giorgione
- Giotto di Bondone
- Jean Goujon
- George Gower
- Benozzo Gozzoli
- El Greco
- Matthias Grünewald
- Juan de Herrera
- Nicholas Hilliard
- Francisco de Holanda
- Hans Holbein the Younger
- Inigo Jones
- Conrad Faber von Kreuznach
- Pierre Lescot
- Fra Filippo Lippi
- Lorenzo Lotto
- Pedro Machuca
- Andrea Mantegna
- Masaccio
- Antonello da Messina
- Michelangelo
- Luis de Morales
- Bernardo Morando
- Pietro Negroni
- Isaac Oliver
- Philibert de l'Orme
- Andrea Palladio
- Palma Vecchio
- Palma il Giovane
- Pietro Perugino
- Sebastian del Piombo
- Andrea Pisano
- Bernard Palissy
- Germain Pilon
- Pisanello
- Jan Polack
- Jacone Puligo
- Giovanni Baptista di Quadro
- Jan van Eyck
- Francesco Primaticcio
- Raphael
- Stanislaw Samostrzelnik
- Sebastiano Serlio
- Luca Signorelli
- Diego Siloe
- Il Sodoma
- Tintoretto
- Titian
- Juan Bautista de Toledo
- Andres de Vandelvira
- Paolo Veronese
- Rogier van der Weyden
- Andreas Vesalius

== Mathematicians ==
- Adriaan van Roomen
- Bartholomaeus Pitiscus
- Christoph Rudolff
- Cuthbert Tunstall

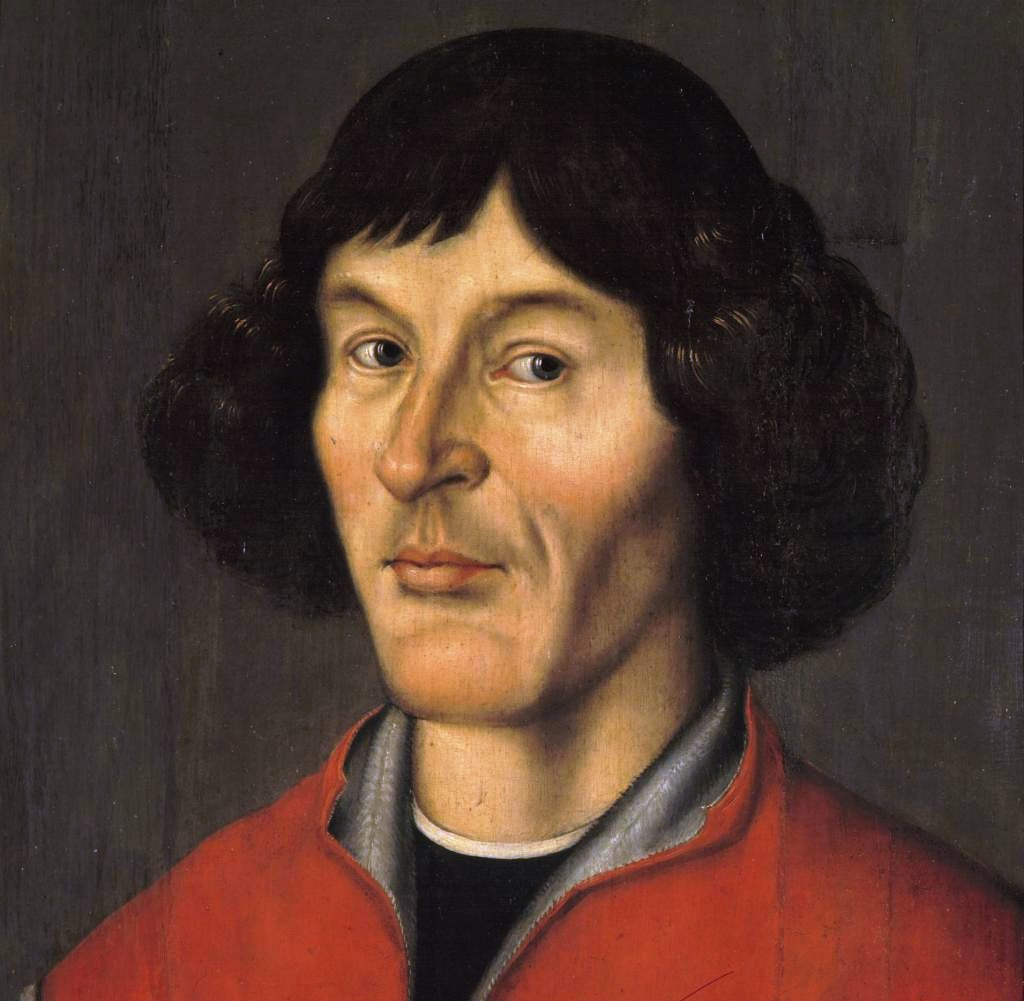
Nicolaus Copernicus

- François d'Aguilon
- Francesco Pellos
- Federico Commandino
- Francesco Barozzi
- Petrus Apianus
- Gerolamo Cardano
- Giovanni Antonio Magini
- Ludolph van Ceulen
- Nicolaus Copernicus
- Gemma Frisius
- Giovanni Bianchini
- Georg von Peuerbach
- Guillaume Gosselin
- Jerónimo Muñoz
- Johannes Werner
- Johannes Buteo
- John Dee
- Jacques Lefèvre d'Étaples
- Juan de Ortega
- Marin Getaldić
- Michael Maestlin
- Guidobaldo del Monte
- John Napier
- Oronce Fine
- Pedro Nunes
- Pedro Ciruelo
- Piero della Francesca
- Simon Stevin
- Thomas Digges
- Thomas Harriot
- William Oughtred
- Luca Pacioli
- Robert Recorde
- Niccolò Fontana Tartaglia
- Galileo

== Writers ==
William Shakespeare

- Desiderius Erasmus
- Ludovico Ariosto
- Lope de Vega
- Martin Bauzer
- Luís de Camões
- Baldassare Castiglione
- Edmund Spenser
- Francis Bacon
- François Rabelais
- Miguel de Cervantes
- Michel de Montaigne
- Marguerite de Navarre
- Geoffrey Chaucer
- Giovanni Boccaccio
- John of the Cross
- John Donne
- Alberico Gentili
- Marko Gerbec
- Ben Jonson
- Jan Kochanowski
- Joachim du Bellay
- Luis de León
- Ludovico Ariosto
- Niccolo Machiavelli
- Christopher Marlowe
- Petrarch
- Christine de Pizan
- Poliziano
- Pietro Aretino
- Philip Sidney
- Torquato Tasso
- Thomas More
- François Rabelais
- Fernando de Rojas
- Lope de Rueda
- Pierre de Ronsard
- William Shakespeare
- Catherine of Siena
- Cicco Simonetta
- Garcilaso de la Vega
- Gil Vicente

== Philosophers ==
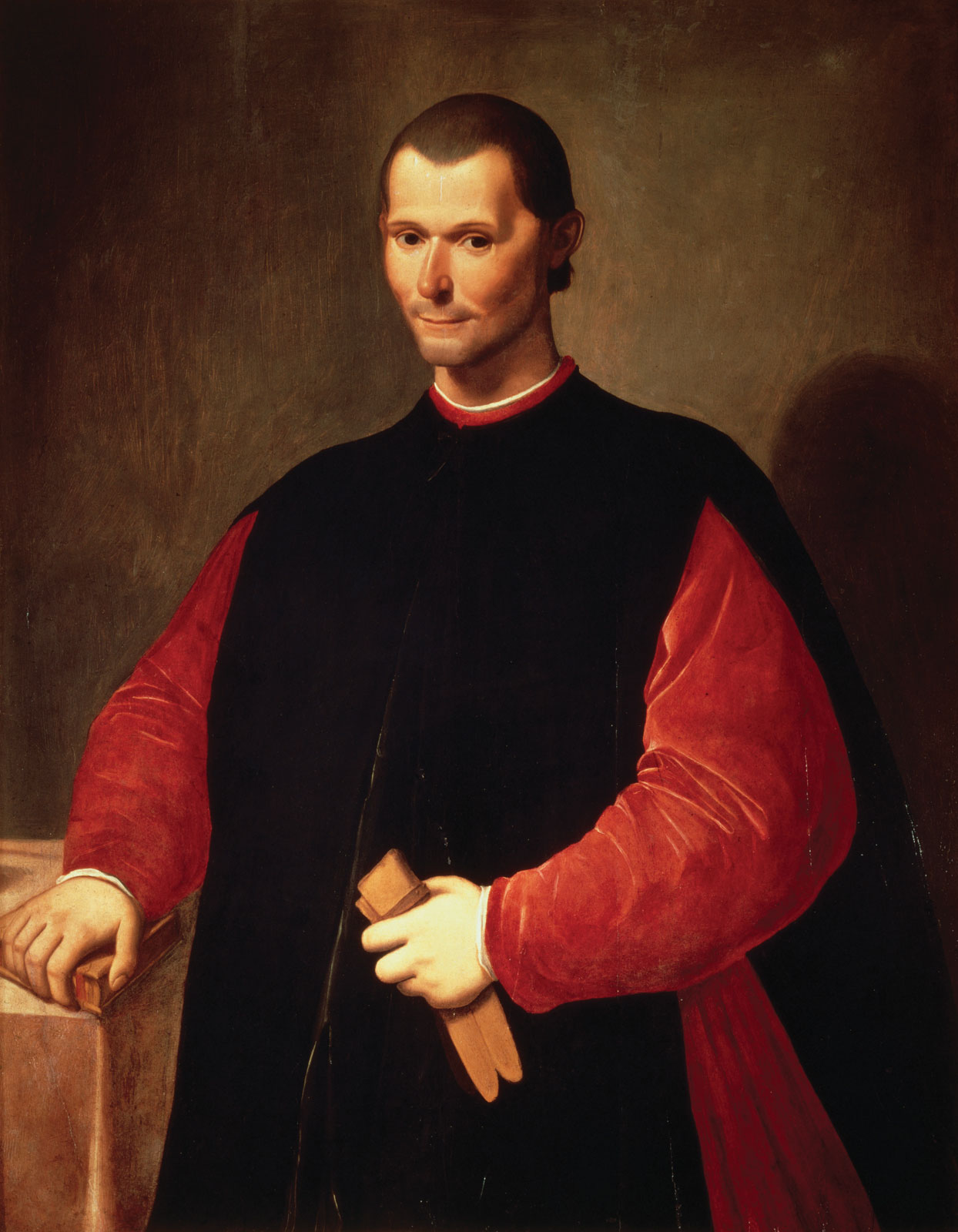
Niccolò Machiavelli

- Coluccio Salutati
- Nicholas of Cusa
- Niccolò Machiavelli
- Pico della Mirandola
- Martín de Azpilcueta
- Giordano Bruno
- Leonardo Bruni
- Lorenzo Valla
- Tommaso Campanella
- Cornelis Drebbel
- Desiderius Erasmus
- Hugo Grotius
- Marsilio Ficino
- Pietro Pomponazzi
- Sebastian Castellio
- Francesco Petrarca
- Francesco Guicciardini
- Francis Bacon
- Jean Bodin
- John Calvin
- Andrzej Frycz Modrzewski
- Michel de Montaigne
- Thomas More
- Antonio Serra
- Francisco Suárez
- Francisco Sanches
- Bernardino Telesio
- Francisco de Vitoria

== Composers ==
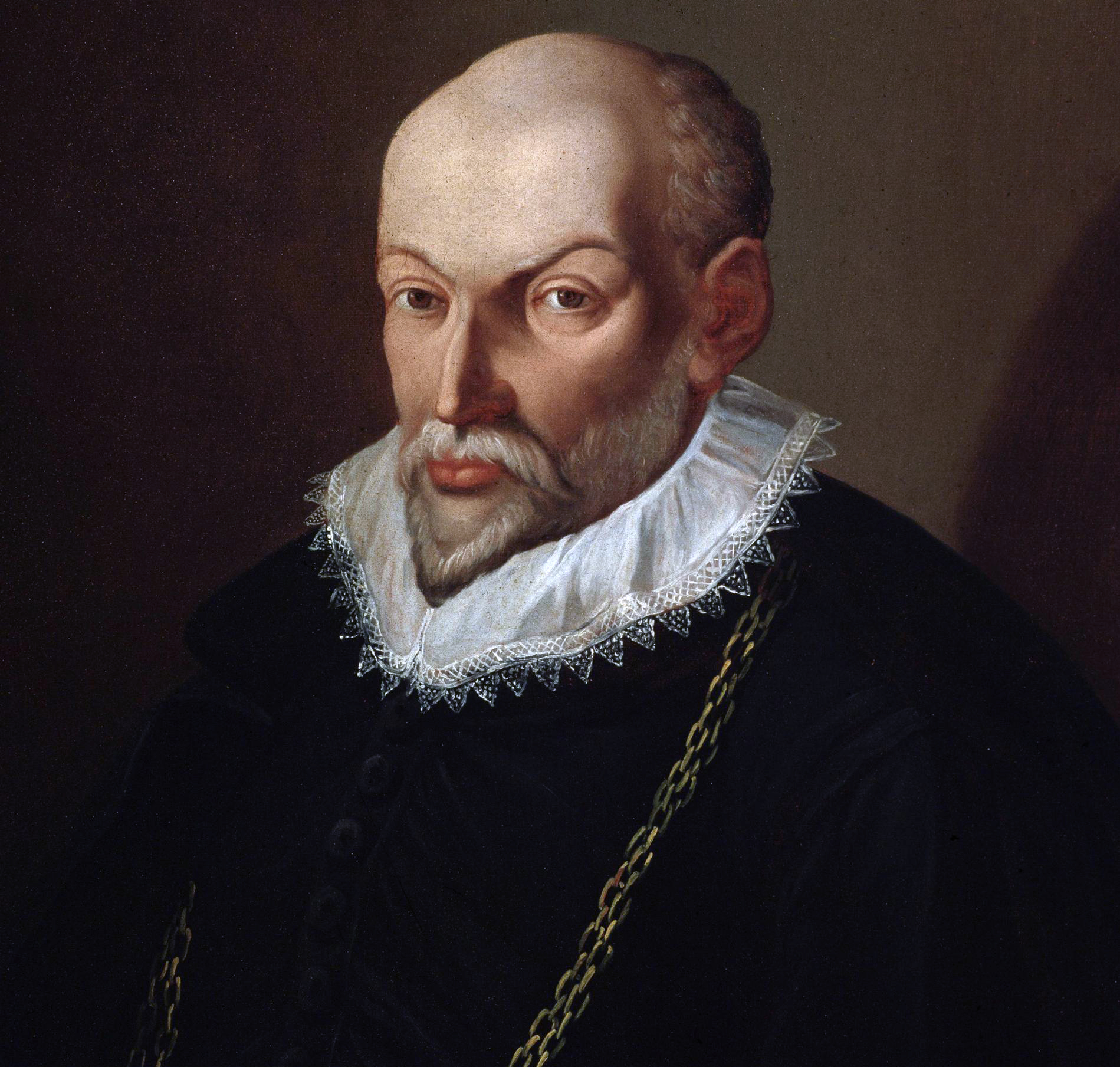
Orlande de Lassus

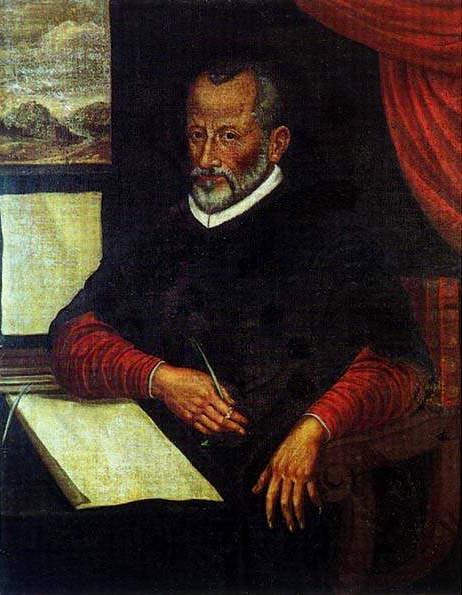
Giovanni Pierluigi da Palestrina

- Adrian Willaert
- Guillaume Du Fay
- Gilles Binchois
- William Byrd
- Antonio de Cabezón
- Josquin des Prez
- John Dowland
- John Dunstaple
- Josquin des Prez
- Juan del Encina
- Guillaume Dufay
- Michelangelo Falvetti
- Andrea Gabrieli
- Giovanni Gabrieli
- Luzzasco Luzzaschi
- Vincenzo Galilei
- Orlando Gibbons
- Jacobus Handl
- Heinrich Isaac
- Clément Janequin
- Orlandus Lassus
- Luca Marenzio
- Ludwig Senfl
- Claudio Monteverdi
- Claude Le Jeune
- Cristóbal de Morales
- Thomas Morley
- Jean Mouton
- Johannes Ockeghem
- Jacob Obrecht
- Jacopo Peri
- Giovanni Pierluigi da Palestrina
- Michael Praetorius
- Pierre de la Rue
- Thomas Tallis
- John Taverner
- Tomás Luis de Victoria
- Antoine Busnois
- Adrian Willaert
- Carlo Gesualdo

== Dancing masters ==
- Balthasar de Beaujoyeulx
- Antonio Cornazzano
- Domenico da Piacenza
- Fabritio Caroso
- Thoinot Arbeau
- Cesare Negri
- Guglielmo Ebreo
- Lutio Compasso
- Livio Lupi da Caravaggio
- John Playford

== Explorers and navigators ==
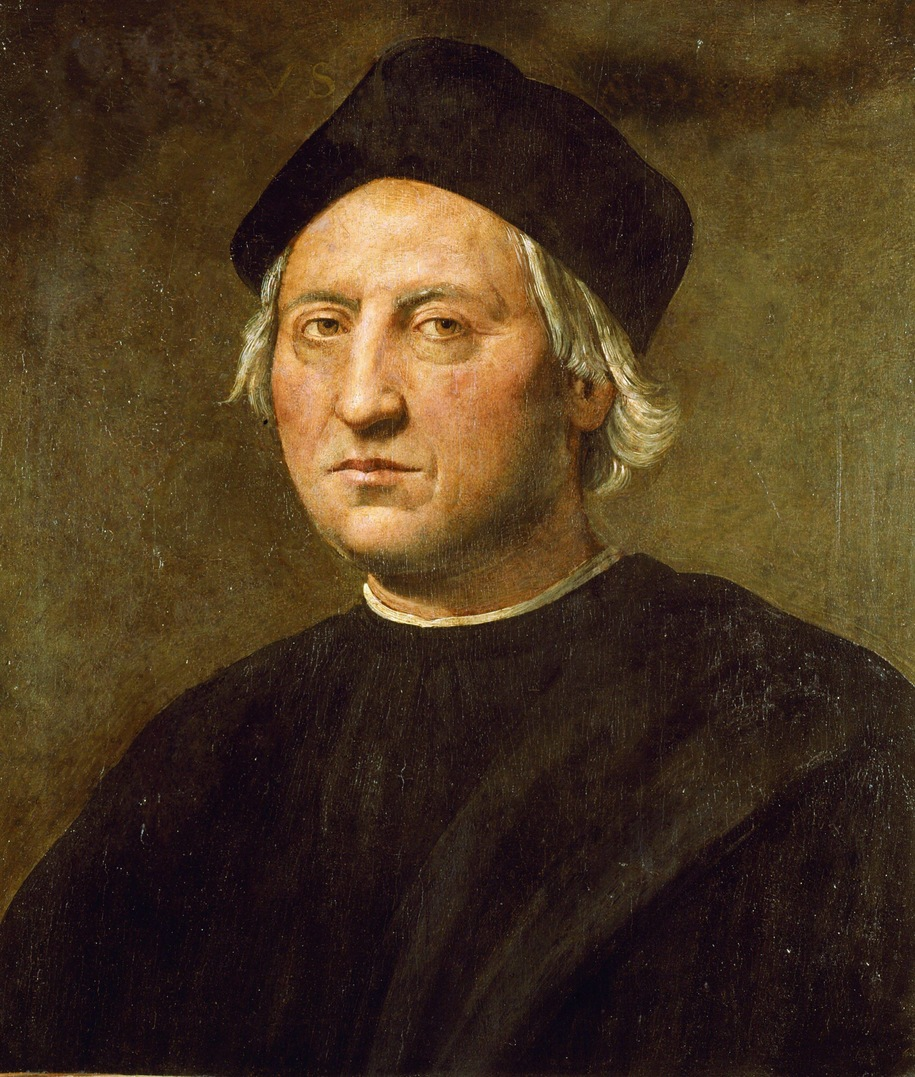
Christopher Columbus

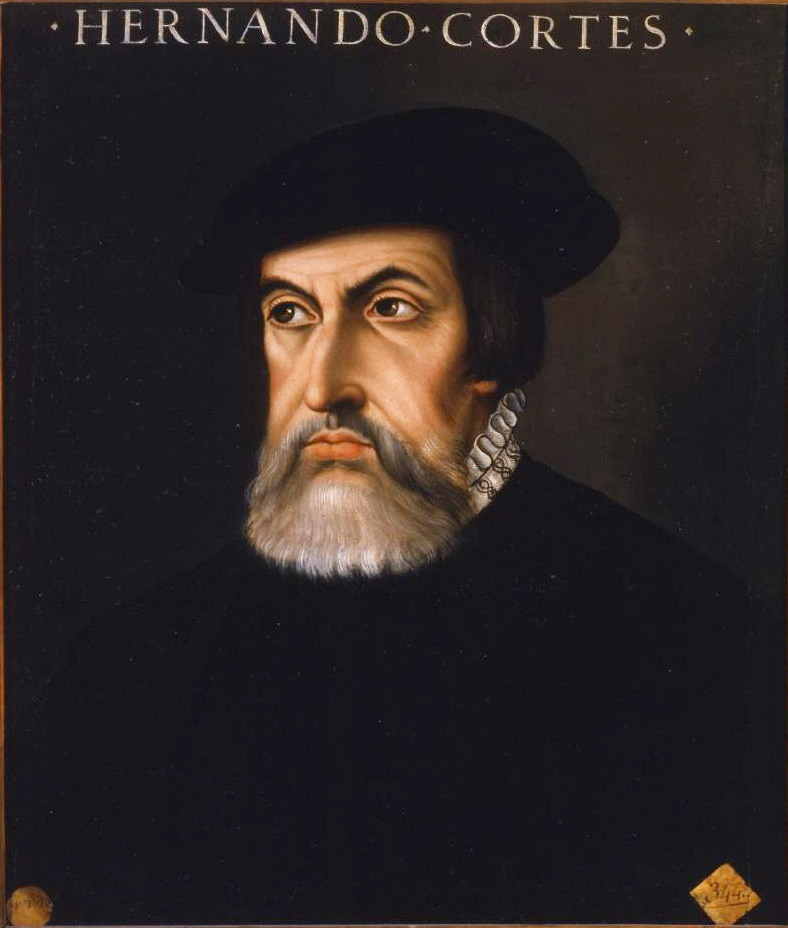
Hernán Cortés

- Christopher Columbus
- Amerigo Vespucci
- Afonso de Albuquerque
- Vasco Núñez de Balboa
- Gonçalo Álvares
- John Cabot
- Giovanni Francesco Gemelli Careri
- Jacques Cartier
- Samuel de Champlain
- Gaspar Corte-Real
- Hernán Cortés
- Martin Frobisher
- Bartolomeu Dias
- Diogo Dias
- Henry Hudson
- Juan Ponce de León
- Sir Francis Drake
- Juan Sebastián Elcano
- Vasco da Gama
- Prince Henry
- Pedro Álvares Cabral
- Willem Janszoon
- Ferdinand Magellan
- Willem Barentsz
- Francisco de Orellana
- Gerardus Mercator
- Vicente Yáñez Pinzón
- Francisco Pizarro
- Marco Polo
- Juan Ponce de León
- Abel Tasman
- Giovanni da Verrazzano
- João Gonçalves Zarco

== Humanists ==
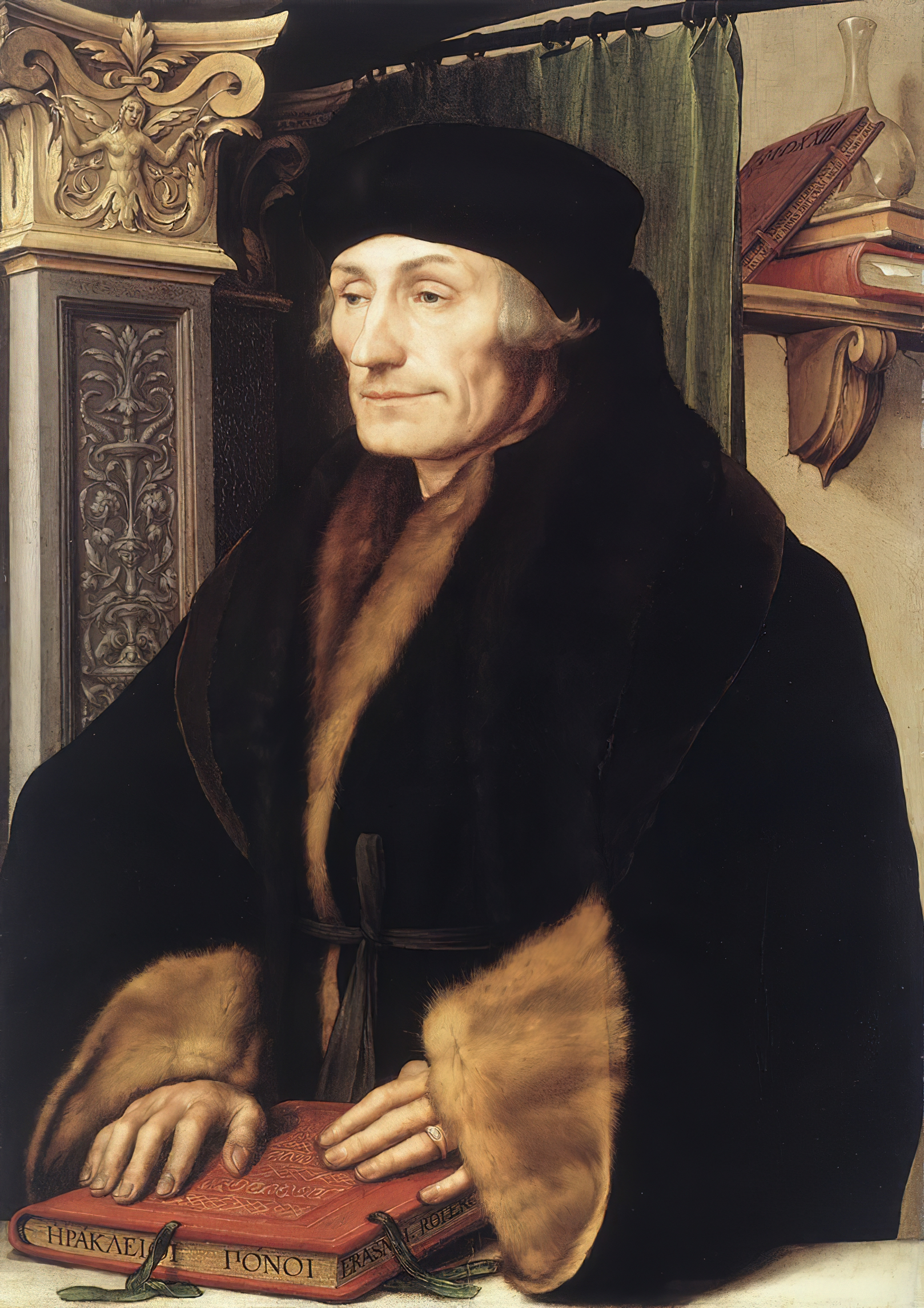
Erasmus of Rotterdam

- Leon Battista Alberti
- Thomas Blundeville
- Giovanni Boccaccio
- Poggio Bracciolini
- Leonardo Bruni
- Johannes Cuspinian
- Erasmus
- Thomas More
- Matteo Palmieri
- Giovanni Pico della Mirandola
- François Rabelais
- Petrus Ramus
- Coluccio Salutati
- Andreas Stöberl
- Georg Tannstetter
- Juan Luis Vives
- Jan Campanus Vodňanský

== Other influential people ==
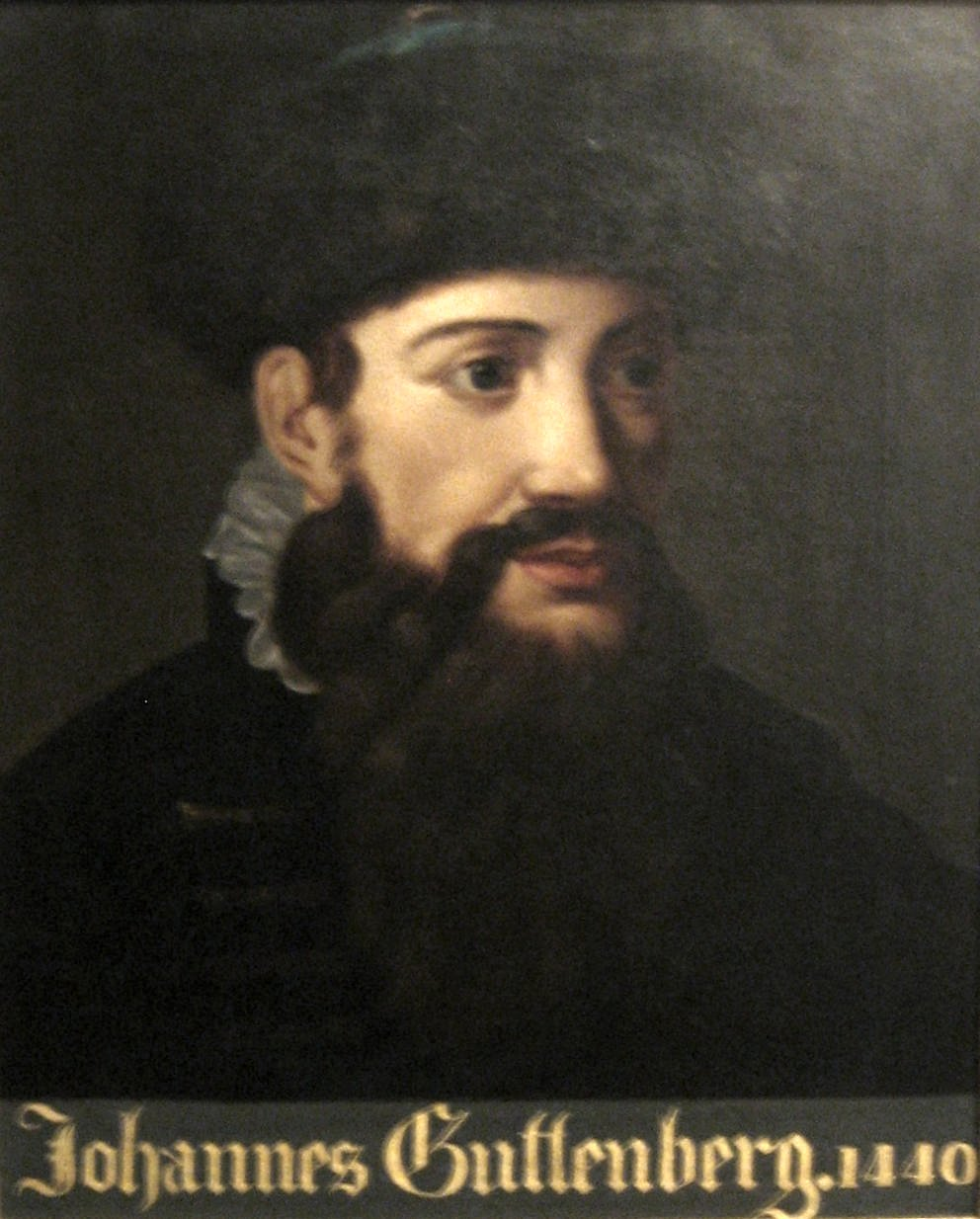
Johannes Gutenberg

- Francis I of France
- Henry VIII
- John Calvin
- Matthias Corvinus
- Johannes Gutenberg
- Elizabeth I
- Pope Julius II
- Martin Luther
- The Medici
  - Lorenzo de' Medici
- Sigismund I the Old
- Jakob Fugger
- Paracelsus
- Girolamo Savonarola
- Taccola
- Giorgio Vasari
- Andreas Vesalius
- Conrad Gessner

== See also ==
- List of Renaissance structures
- Index of Renaissance articles
