= Michael Baxandall =

British art historian (1933–2008)

Michael David Kighley Baxandall, FBA (18 August 1933 – 12 August 2008) was a British art historian and a professor emeritus of Art History at the University of California, Berkeley. He taught at the Warburg Institute, University of London, and worked as a curator at the Victoria and Albert Museum. His book Painting and Experience in Fifteenth-Century Italy was profoundly influential in the social history of art, and is (2018) widely used as a textbook in college courses.

== Career ==
Baxandall was born in Cardiff, the only son of David Baxandall, a curator who was at one time director of the National Gallery of Scotland. He went to Manchester Grammar School and studied English at Downing College, Cambridge, where he was taught by F. R. Leavis. In 1955 he departed for the Continent. He spent a year at Pavia University (1955–56), then taught at an international school in St. Gallen in Switzerland (1956–57), and finally went to Munich to hear the art historian Hans Sedlmayr and where he worked with Ludwig Heinrich Heydenreich on the court of Urbino at the Zentralinstitut für Kunstgeschichte. On his return to London in 1958 he began a long association with the Warburg Institute, initially working in the photographic collection, where he met Kay Simon, whom he married in 1963. From 1959 to 1961 he was a junior fellow, working on his never-completed PhD, Restraint in Renaissance behaviour, under Ernst Gombrich.

From 1961, he was Assistant Keeper in the Department of Architecture and Sculpture at the Victoria and Albert Museum, returning to the Warburg Institute in 1965 as lecturer in Renaissance Studies. He was appointed to a chair by the University of London in 1981, but increasingly spent his time in the United States. He was A. D. White Professor-at-Large at Cornell University and became a half-time Professor of the History of Art at the University of California, Berkeley, in 1987. He was elected a Fellow of the American Academy of Arts and Sciences in 1991. He was Slade Professor of Fine Art at the University of Oxford for 1974–75.

== Books ==
His book Giotto and the Orators was published in 1971. This was followed in 1972 by Painting and Experience in Fifteenth Century Italy, now considered a classic of art history, in which he developed the influential concept of the period eye. These were followed by The Limewood Sculptors of Renaissance Germany (1980), Patterns of Intention (1985), Tiepolo and the Pictorial Intelligence (1994, with Svetlana Alpers), Shadows and Enlightenment (1994) and Words for Pictures (2003). In all his work, Baxandall was concerned to illuminate artworks by a thorough exploration of the conditions of their production – intellectual, social, and physical. In Limewood Sculptors this took the form of using "carvings as lenses bearing on their own circumstances".

Despite his impact in "social" art history, Baxandall often retreated from Marxist or overly "contextual" approaches. At one point, he declared that he was just "trying to do Roger Fry...in a different way," and he often cited the impact of Heinrich Wölfflin's book Classic Art.

== Publications ==
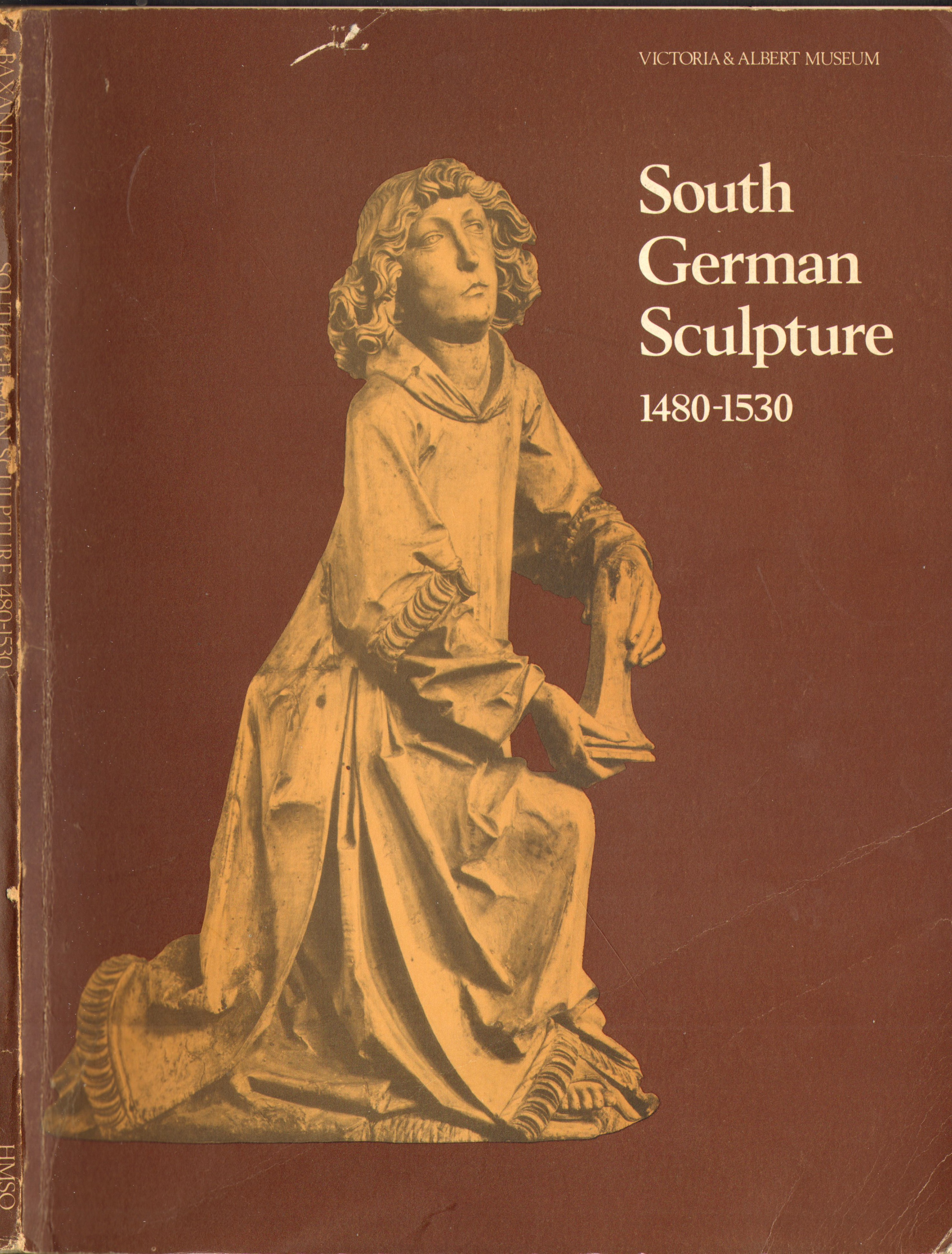
Front cover of South German Sculpture 1480-1530

- Giotto and the Orators. Humanist observers of painting in Italy and the discovery of pictorial composition 1350-1450, Oxford University Press, 1971
- Painting and Experience in 15th century Italy, Oxford UP, 1972
- South German Sculpture 1480-1530, H.M. Stationery Office, 1974
- The Limewood Sculptors of Renaissance Germany, Yale University Press, 1980
- Patterns of Intention: On the Historical Explanation of Pictures, Yale UP, 1985
- with Svetlana Alpers: Tiepolo and the Pictorial Intelligence, Yale UP, 1994
- Shadows and Enlightenment, Yale UP, 1995
- Words for Pictures: Seven Papers on Renaissance Art and Criticism, Yale UP, 2003
- Episodes: a Memory Book, with an introduction by Carlo Ginzburg, Frances Lincoln, 2010
- A Grasp of Kaspar, Frances Lincoln, 2010

=== On Baxandall ===
- Michael Baxandall, Vision and the Work of Words, ed. by Peter Mack & Robert Williams, Farnham, 2015
- Langdale, Allen. "Aspects of the Critical Reception and Intelletual History of Baxandall's Concept of the Period Eye." Art History 21, no. 4 (1998): 479-97.

== See also ==
- Period eye
