= Sgabello =

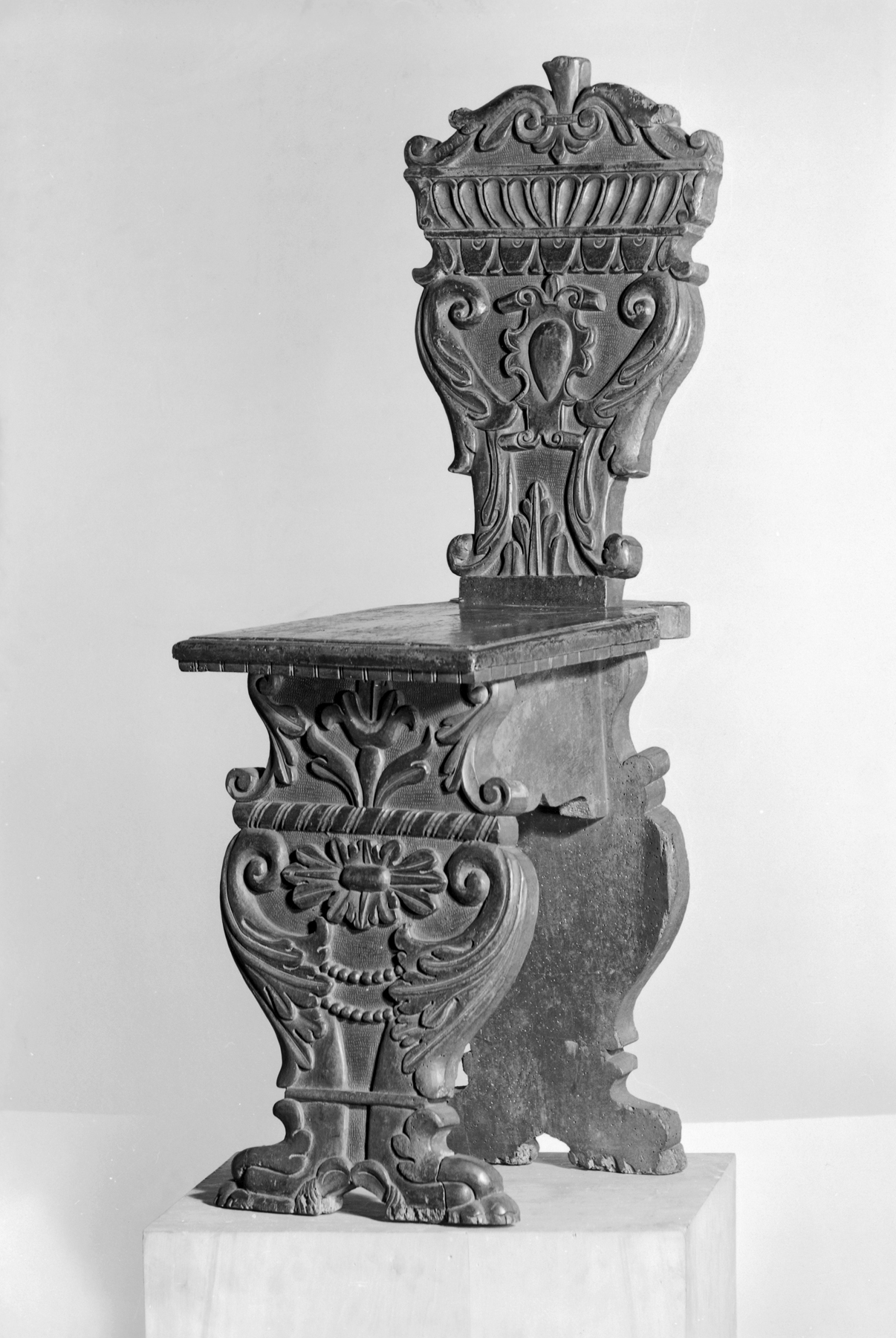
A 16th-century French walnut sgabello (Walters Art Museum)

A sgabello is a type of stool typical of the Italian Renaissance. An armchair with armrests usually was a chair (sedia) of hieratic(hierarchic?) significance. Sgabelli were typically made of walnut and included a variety of carvings and turned elements. The legs could be either two decorated boards with a stretcher for support, or three separate ornamented and carved impost legs. This seat was often placed in hallways, carved with a family's imprese or emblem drawn from its coat-of-arms. Its primary purpose was decorative, therefore the seat was not necessarily comfortable. Similar chairs were made in France, where they were known as a side chair. These had solid supports called rhombus seat supports. They were not used as stools.

== Gallery ==
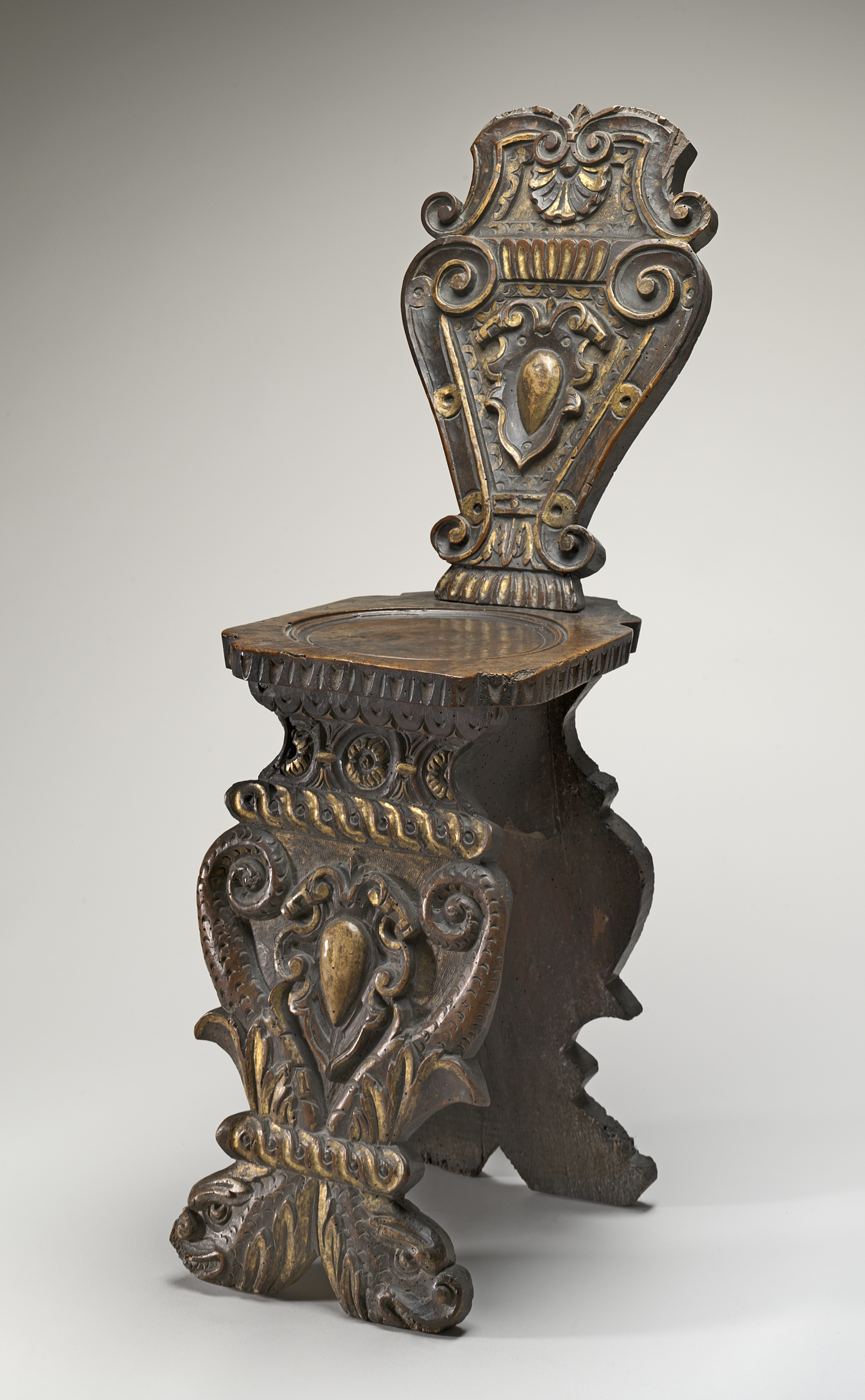
Italian 16th Century, Walnut Stool (Sgabello), Carved and Gilded, c. 1540–1560, National Gallery of Art

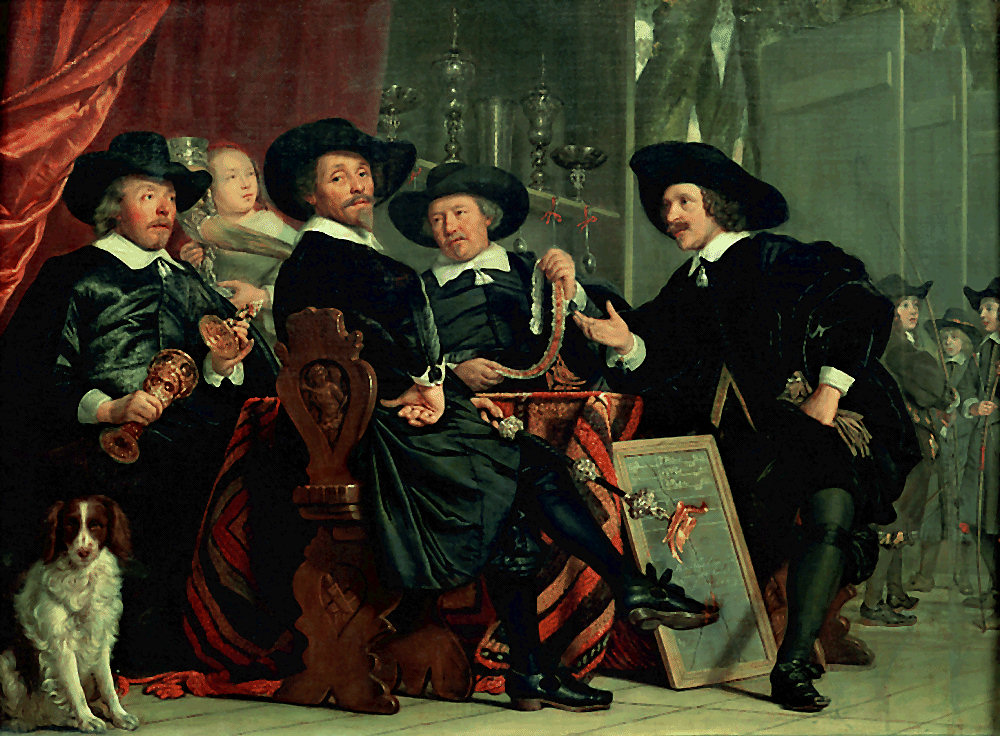
Members of an Amsterdam schutterscompagnie painted in 1653 are seated on sgabelli that may have been heirlooms, as are the silver objects they inspect and display.

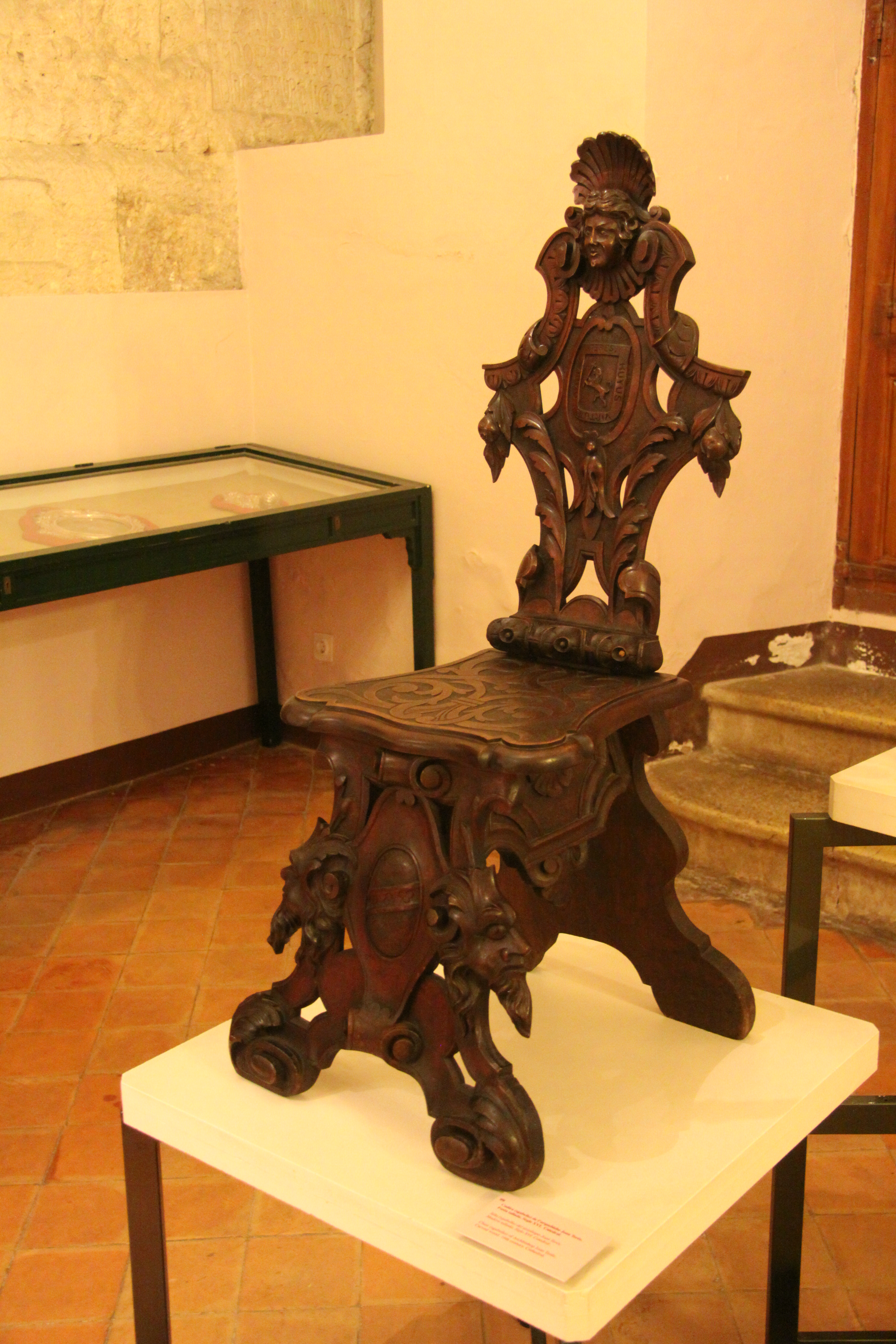
16th century sgabello of archbishop Joan Terès i Borrull.

Sgabello, 16th-century.
