= Stipo a bambocci =

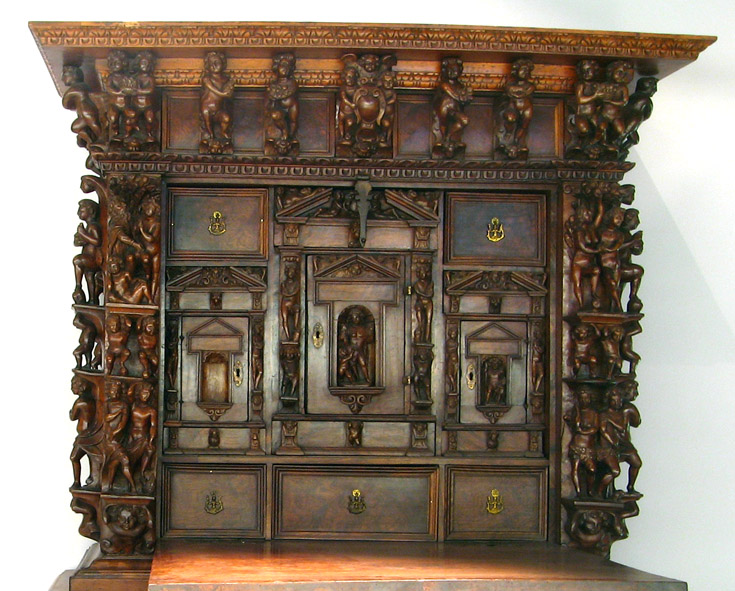
Stipo a bambocci

Stipo a bambocci (plural: Stipi a bambocci) is a writing cabinet, which was made during the Renaissance in Upper Italy and which can be locked by a fall-front.

The characteristic features of the stipo a bambocci are the carved small, chubby child-figures. In the history of furniture-design these cabinets appear unique in their decoration through their shape and design. On some surviving examples the bambocci-figures correspond with each other and are composed in a certain iconographical context, such as the Expulsion from the Garden of Eden on one cabinet in the Castello Sforzesco in Milan.

The wood used for construction is walnut as well as burr-walnut and partly even the costly imported Caucasian walnut.

== Workshop ==
On the basis of new research it was possible to identify a workshop, which developed and produced the stipo a bambocci as a new type of writing-cabinet.

== Period and localization ==
The earliest stipo a bambocci appeared around or shortly after 1560 in Genoa/ the region of Liguria. After having gained the interest of the nobility the demand for stipi a bambocci started to grow and the production of individual cabinets (in the sense of the iconography) began. The end of the first decade of the 17th century marks also the end of the creation of the stipo a bambocci.

== Surviving pieces ==
Today only very few original stipi a bambocci (<12 pieces) survive. They are in distinguished private collections and museums, e.g. in Milan in the Museo Poldi-Pezzoli, Bagatti-Valsecchi and in the Castello Sforzesco.

Stipo a bambocci, Private Collection, Switzerland

Detail of Stipo a bambocci 2

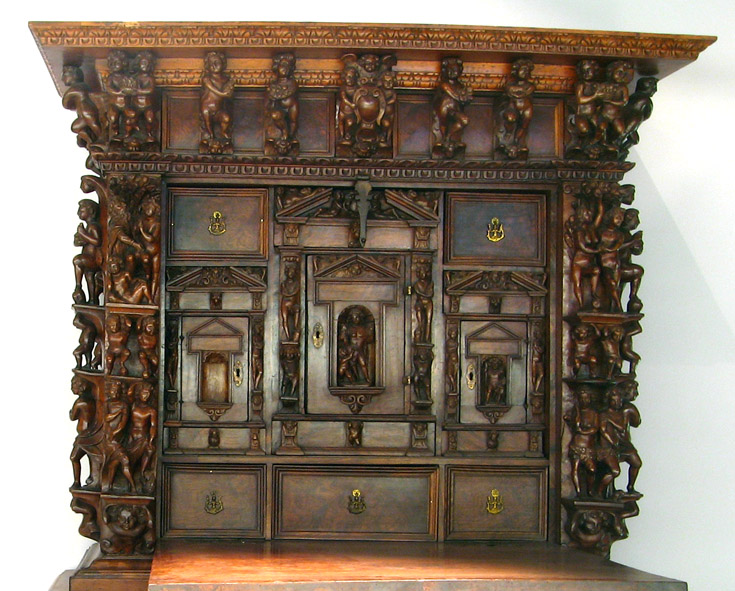
Stipo a bambocci in the Castello Sforzesco, Milan, Italy

Stipo a bambocci, Private Collection
