= Prestezza =

Painting technique

In art, prestezza is a painting technique that utilizes rapid brushstrokes to make impressions of faces and objects as opposed to painting them out in detail. The technique allows for faster painting and makes the undercoat an integral part of the painting itself.

== History ==
The Italian Renaissance painter Tintoretto first developed the method to increase the output of his workshop.

The prestezza method consists of three steps:

At first the artist applied a brown undercoat, using a color that was used for etching technology, on the canvas. Thereafter he made a rough drawing using white colour, very often like a sketch. Then the actual painting process started.

Tintoretto believed that increased artistic output at lower cost would be more profitable than his meticulous, multi-layered brushwork of his former employer, Titian. Tintoretto relied on quick execution, flexible pricing, and high turnover to fill the market gap left by Titian's exclusively high-end patrons However, the prestezza technique's unfinished look was unsatisfactory to many patrons. For example, the use of the technique in Raising of Lazarus resulted in "...movements [which] are indicated by broad movements of the brush. ...[t]he background area is hidden in shadow, which allows the painter to indicate with minimum definition the presence of twenty figures required by the contract signed by his patron." Giorgio Vasari described the end result as, "[he] has left as finished works sketches still so rough that the brush-strokes may be seen." Tintoretto's refusal to redo his delivered work and led to customer alienation. Still, he enjoyed a level of success comparable to other leading Venetian painters.

== Gallery ==
The effect can be observed in several of Tintoretto's paintings:

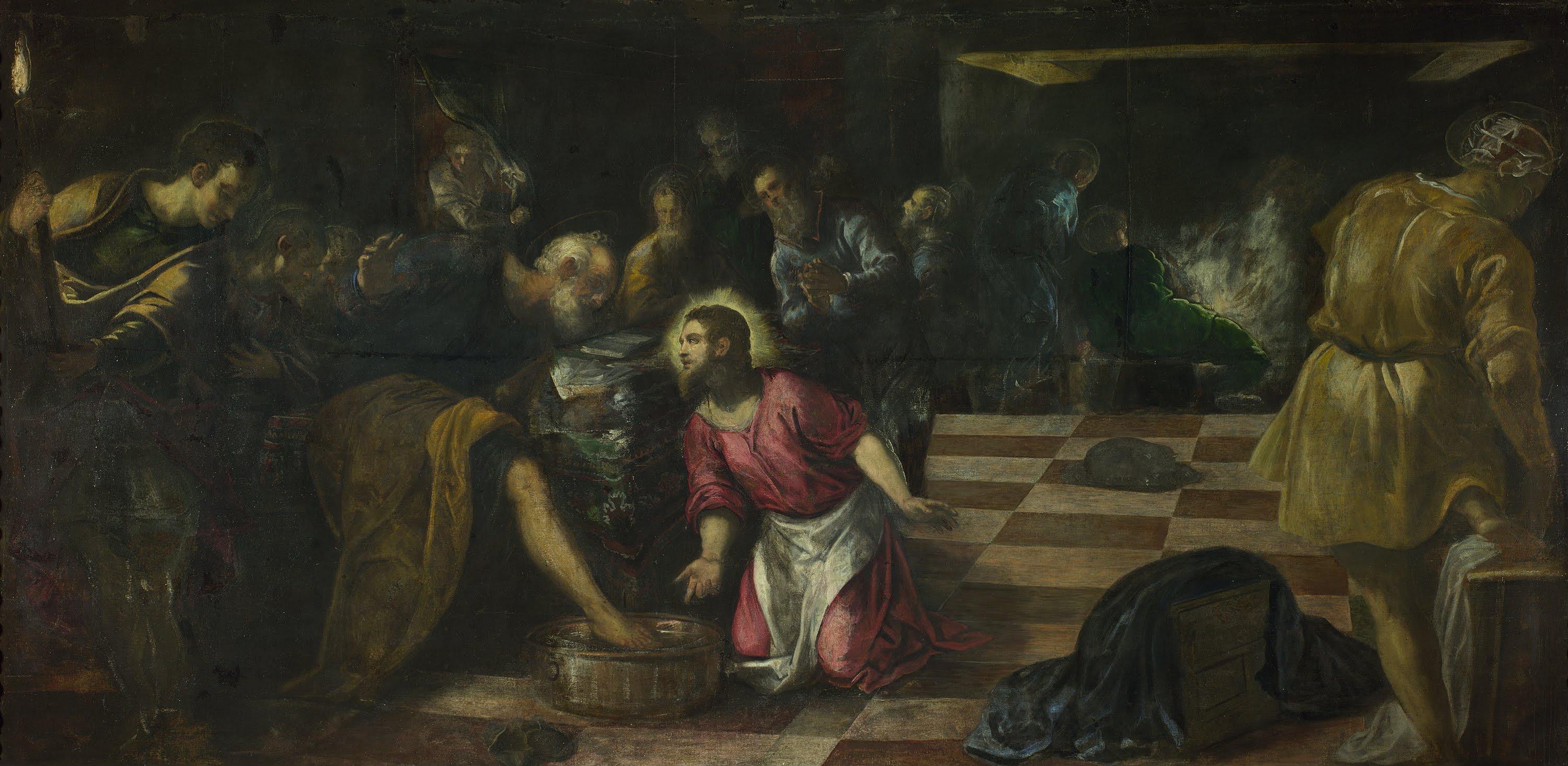
Tintoretto's painting shows background figures painted with the prestezza technique.

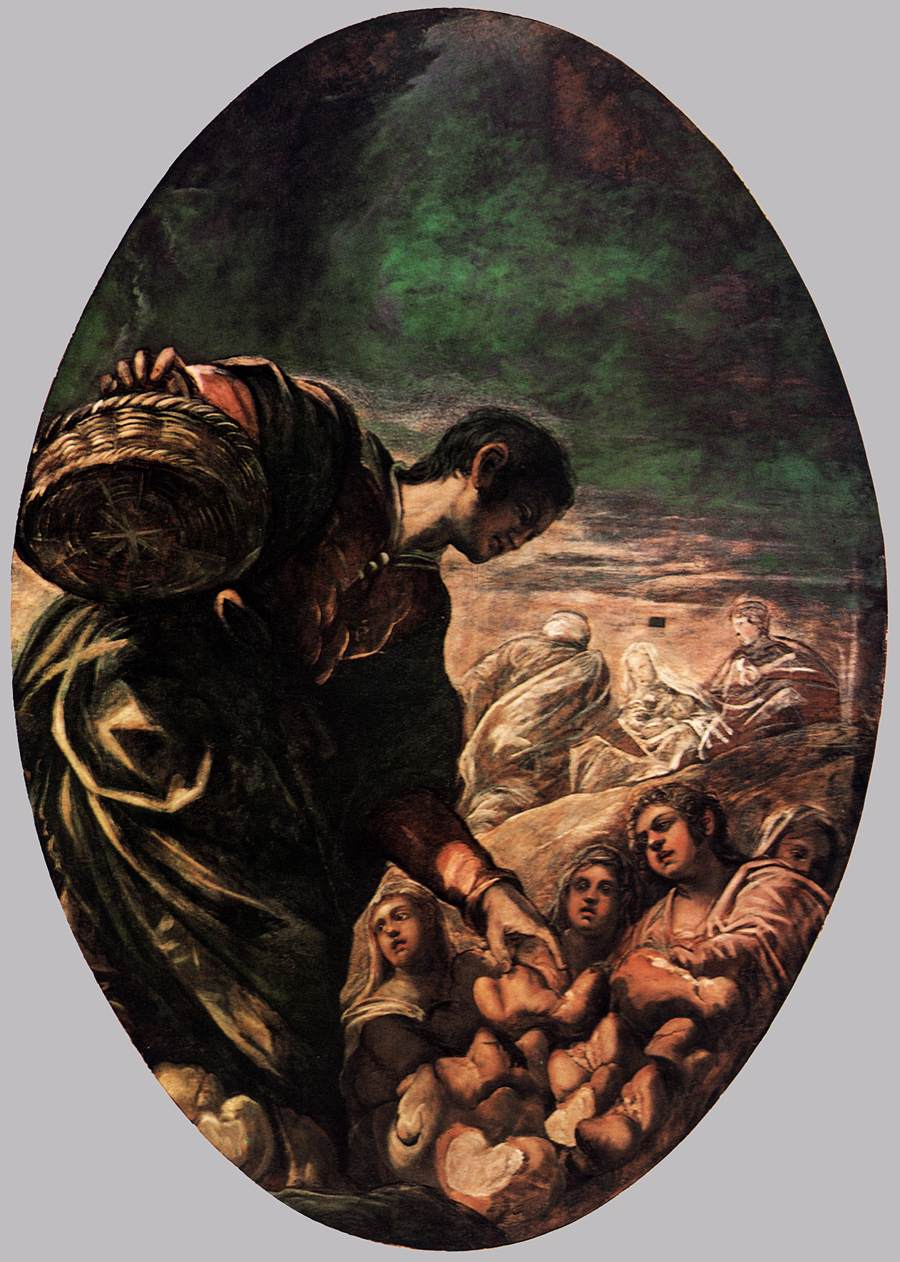
Figures on the center right appear almost as outlines.

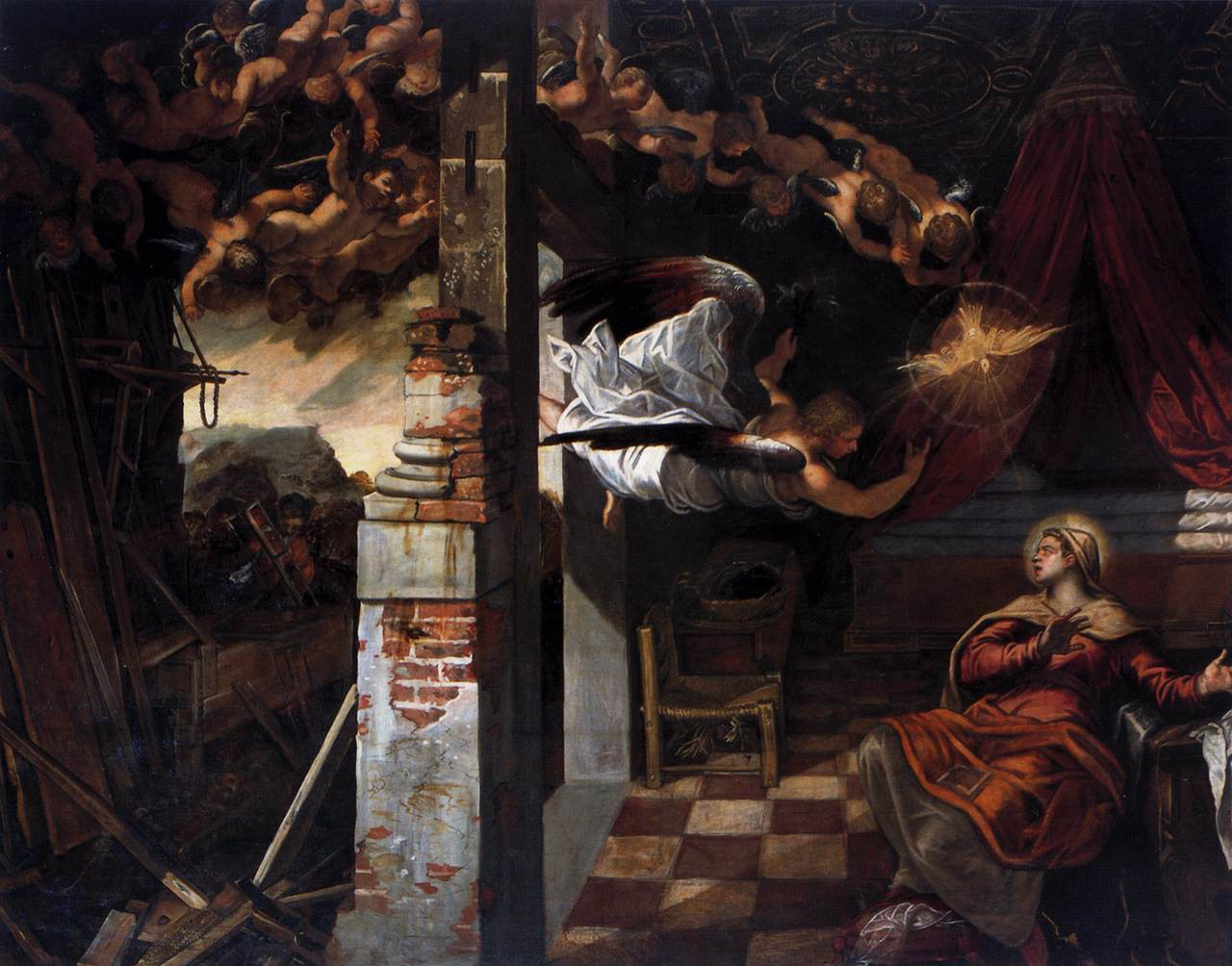
Tintoretto's Annunciation, with the ceilings and angels on the upper left showing a lack of detail.
