= The Triumph of Fame =

Tapestry made in Flanders

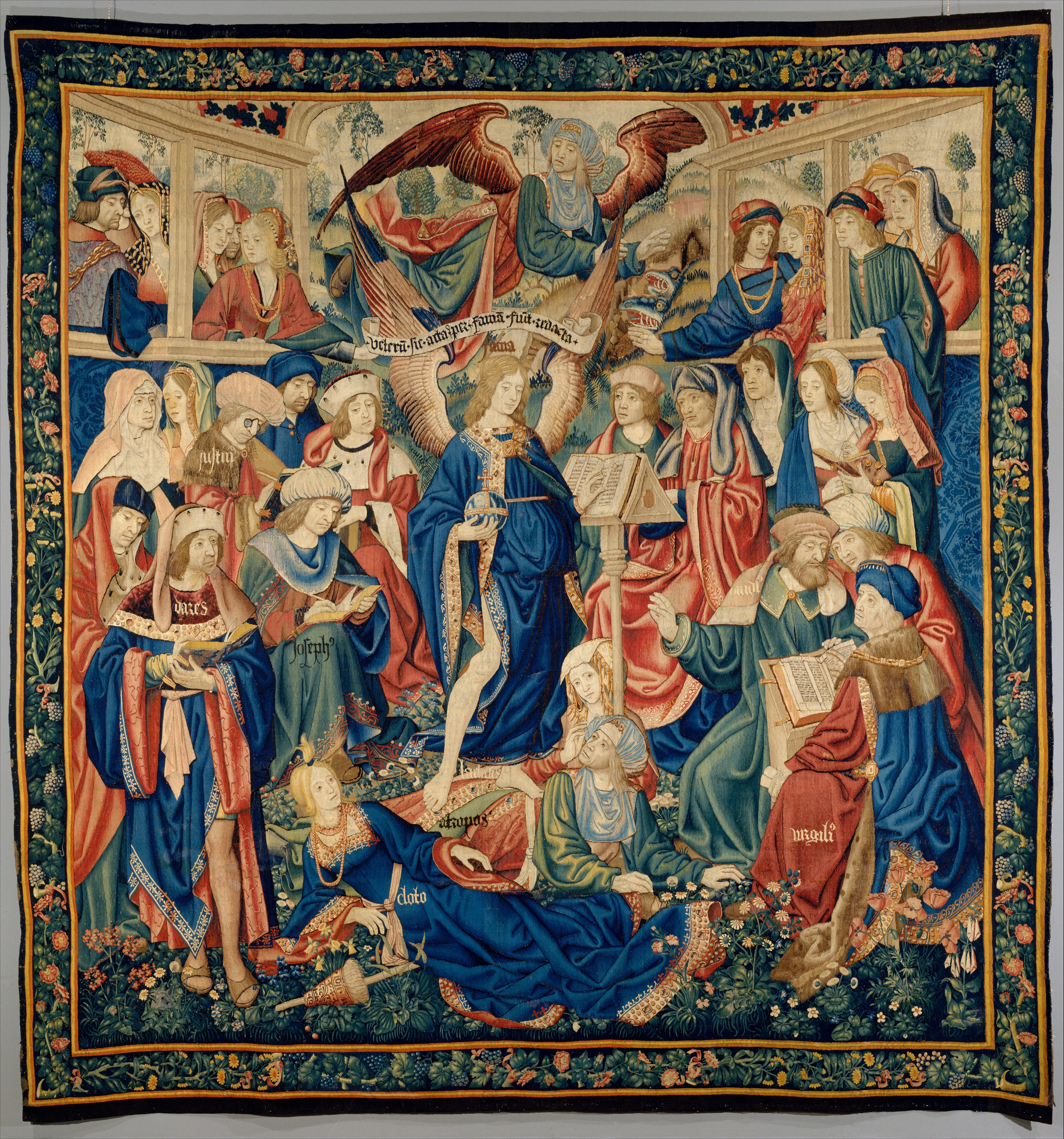
- Year: 1500s
- Medium: wool, silk
- Dimensions: 359.4 cm (141.5 in) × 335.3 cm (132.0 in)
- Location: Metropolitan Museum of Art
- Accession No.: 1998.205
- Identifiers: The Met object ID: 230011

The Triumph of Fame is a tapestry made in Flanders in the 1500s. It is in the collection of the Metropolitan Museum of Art.

== Creation ==
The Triumph of Fame is one of a set of six tapestries, the other five of which are now lost, based on Petrarch's Trionfi. It was created probably in Brussels, by an unknown workshop.

This work, or one identical to it, was bought by Queen Isabella of Spain and Castile in 1504.

This tapestry uses a silk weft that covers the wool warp. In typical Renaissance production style, this tapestry would have been woven using a warp stretched over two rollers, following a painted cartoon underneath it using small areas of color, or hachures, that in juxtaposition form complicated visual effects of vibration and shading.

== Description and interpretation ==
The six tapestries together depicted "the consecutive triumphs of Love, of Chastity over Love, of Death over Chastity, of Fame over Death, of Time over Fame, and of Religion over Time." The banderole over the figure of Fame, who stands victorious over the Fates beneath her, reads "VETER[UM].SIC.ACTA.PER.FAMA[M].FU[ER]UNT.REDACTA" [Thus the deeds of the ancients were immortalized by fame].
