= Cantore al liuto =

Musicians and composers at the end of the 15th century in Italy

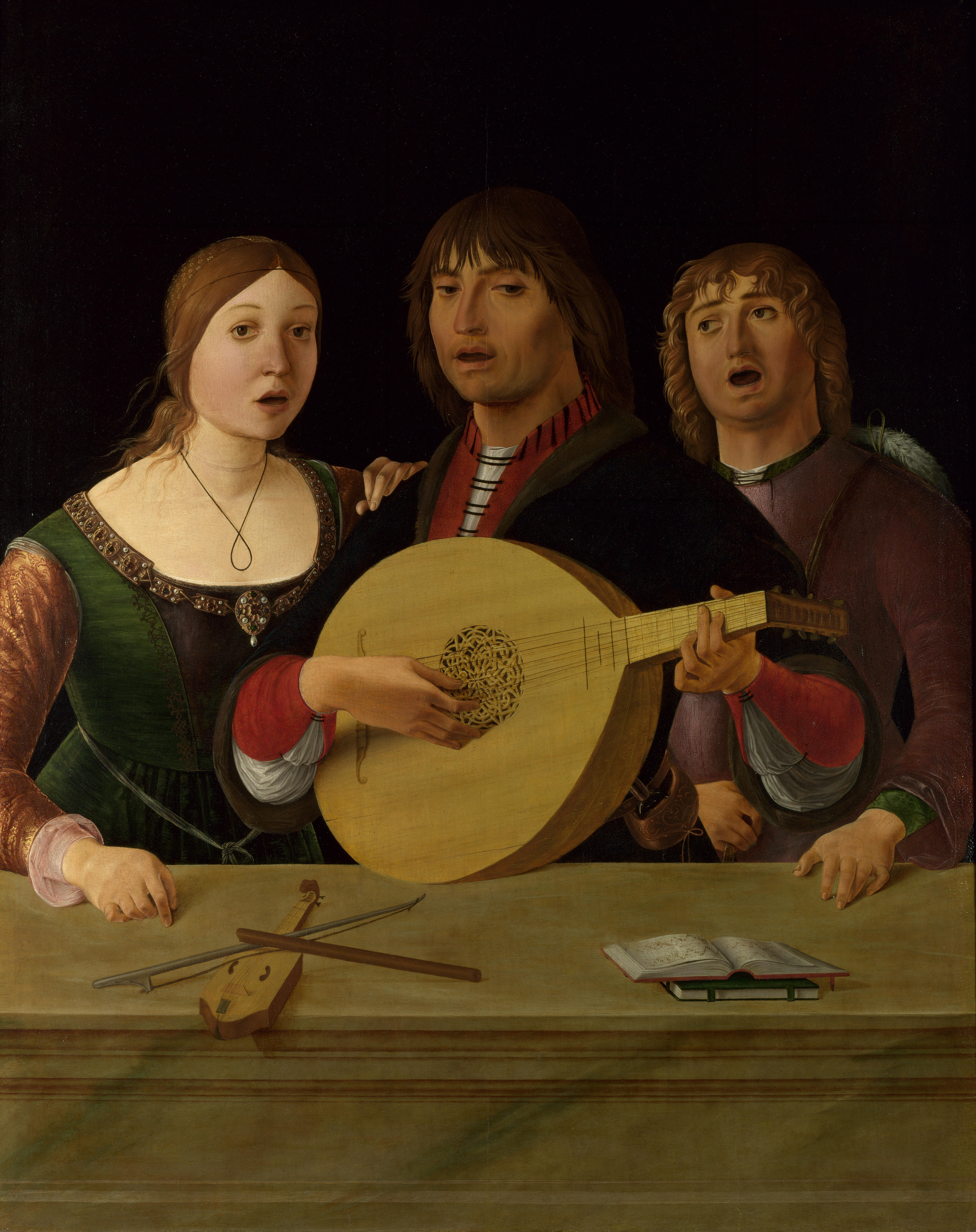
Un Concerto by Lorenzo Costa

The cantore al liuto – typical Italian definition for musicians and composers at the end of 1400 – is the singing lutist whose description and historical representation are deeply rooted in the past going back to the myth of Orpheus.

== Origins and references ==
If the image of the European medieval minstrel remembers that of the more ancient storyteller from Asia, the consolidated tradition of singing accompanied by a string instrument whose memory still survives today in our musical culture, is strictly linked to the singing lutist mentioned above. It was the famous Italian poet Francesco Petrarca (1304–1374) one of the earliest Italian rhymers who was named "cantore al liuto", and it is known that he used to put in music his rhymes and to sing accompanying himself on his lute; he, in his turn, was looking back at the tradition of the troubadours and trouvères of the French tradition.

== Interpreters in history ==
After Petrarca, in the Renaissance age, the most famous singers at the lute certainly were Bartolomeo Tromboncino, Ippolito Tromboncino and Marchetto Cara, whose gift as interpreters are highlighted in The Book of the Courtier by Baldassarre Castiglione.

Later on, in the early 1600s we find Bartolomeo Barbarino called "the pesarino".

The expressive characteristics of this particular figure of musician are currently revisited by Simone Sorini, a tenor and multi-instrumentalist that over the years has gained and refined a deep knowledge of the Medieval and Renaissance plectrum instruments. He plays his instruments – each one made according to the ancient iconography – accompanying himself while singing, bringing back to light the ancient profession of the "cantore al liuto".

== Sources ==
- Decameron, Giovanni Boccaccio, 1349–1351
- Il Cortegiano, Baldassarre Castiglione, 1528

== Videos ==
- "Vergine Bella" by Bartolomeo Tromboncino performed by Simone Sorini
- "Non so qual'ì mi voglia"
- "Lucente Stella
- "Polorum Regina" e "Laus Trinitati"
- "Chiare, fresche, dolci acque"
- "Baude Cordier – Jacob de Senlèches"
- "A Madre de Jesu Cristo"
