= Hours of Lorenzo de' Medici =

15th century illuminated prayer book

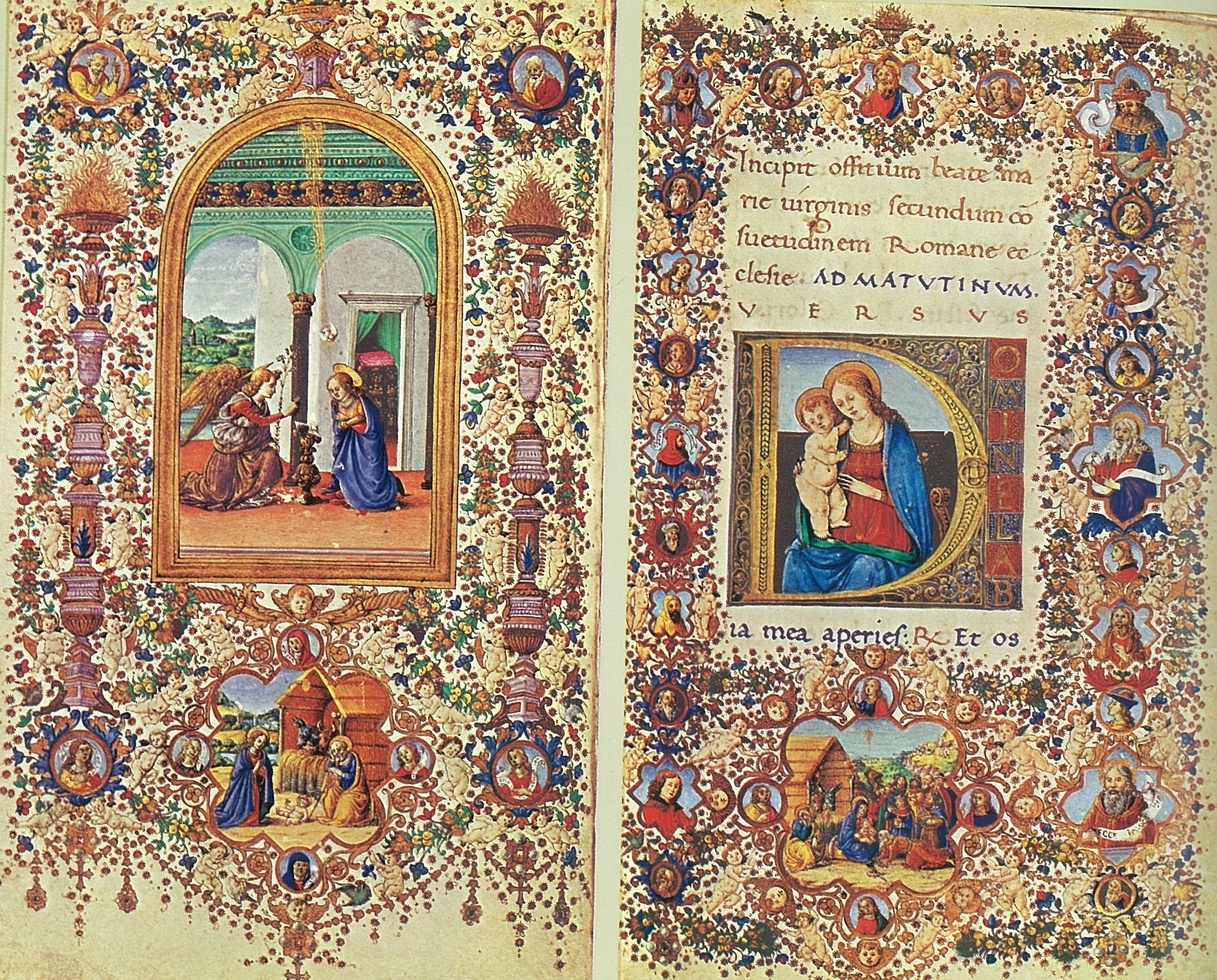
Folio

The Hours of Lorenzo de' Medici is a Renaissance book of Hours produced in Florence for Lorenzo de' Medici in the style of Francesco di Antonio del Chierico, the favourite miniature painter of Lorenzo's grandfather Cosimo de' Medici. It follows the Roman liturgy of the hours and contains illustrated calendars of saints and nine large miniatures with decorative borders.
