= Geohumoral theory =

Geohumoral theory or Geohumoralism was a racialist concept propounded in Renaissance Europe. Briefly, it "held that variations in topography and climate produced variations in national characteristics" (Wilson 133).

This embodied the early modern "...common way of understanding human nature...through analyzing how European bodies altered as a result of being in one climate rather than another – some Europeans, notably those in cold northern climes, such as the English and Scots, and those in southern climes, such as those close to the shores of tropical Africa, had their bodies altered sufficiently by environmental factors so as to be morally defective and physically decrepit" (Abulafia qtd. in Burnard par. 7). Geohumoralism was, in part, a philosophical justification for the European imperial encroachment upon the New World.
