= Elizabethan leisure =

In the Elizabethan era (1558–1603), there was a wide range of leisure activities entertaining both the nobility and the common classes. Among these leisure activities were animal fighting, team sports, individual sports, games, dramatics, music and the arts.

== Blood sports ==
A variety of pastimes which would now be considered blood sports were popular. Cock fighting was a common pastime, and the bets on this game could amount to thousands of pounds, an exorbitant amount of money in those days, and many respectable gentlemen lost all their money this way. Henry VIII had a royal cockpit built at one of his palaces.

Young boys on Shrove Tuesday would normally bring in their own fighting rooster and would spend the afternoon at school placing bets on which rooster would win. The most famous cock-pit in London was in Drury Lane, and most towns and villages had their own pit.

There were other common animal sports: bear-baiting, bullfighting, dog fighting, and cock throwing. Bowls was also extremely popular in the Elizabethan era.

== Hunting ==
Various types of hunting were popular with the nobility. The stag, boar, roe, buck, badgers, otters, hares, and foxes were also hunted. Greyhounds and Irish Wolfhounds were common for hunting.

For the upper class, hawking was a popular sport. Much time was spent on training a hawk or falcon, and keeping it in good condition, requiring many pieces of expensive, specialized equipment, making it too expensive for the lower classes.

Queen Elizabeth I was very fond of both hunting and hawking.

== Team sports ==
Elizabethan style football was comparable to the present-day sports of rugby union and rugby league. Two teams rushed against each other, trying to get the "ball" in through the goalposts. "Cudgels" was also a popular sport among young men. A type of stick fighting, it was a sport effectively training for sword fighting, but using wooden wasters or simple cudgels.

=== Music and dance ===
Music was greatly enjoyed throughout this era, as seen through quite a few family evenings including musical performances. Children were taught to sing and dance at a very early age and became used to performing in public during such evenings. Keyboard instruments such as harpsichords, clavichords, dulcimers and virginals were played. Woodwind instruments like woodsy, crumhorns, flutes and stringed instruments such as lutes and rebecs were also widely used.

Court dances included the pavane and galliard, the almain and the volta, whilst among popular dances were the branle, The Barley-Break (a setting by William Byrd is in My Ladye Nevells Booke), Nobody’s Jig (of which a version was set by Richard Farnaby) and the Shake-a-Trot.
