= Period eye =

The period eye is a concept that was devised by Michael Baxandall and described in his innovative Painting and Experience in Fifteenth-Century Italy: A Primer in the Social History of Pictorial Style, where he used it to describe the cultural conditions under which art in the Italian Renaissance was created, viewed, and understood.

== The concept ==
Baxandall argued that everyone processes visual information in the brain in a different way, using a combination of innate skills and skills based on experience, which are often culturally determined. He suggested that cultural factors influence the visual characteristics that are attractive at any particular time. The period eye examines how artists and their works functioned in their original social, commercial and religious context and has been called an "...anthropological analysis of a society’s visual culture." that "...emphasizes the cultural constructedness of vision...". The concept attempts to reconstruct the mental and visual equipment brought to bear on works of art in a particular place and time and "...the social acts and cultural practices that shape attention to visual form within a given culture."

Baxandall developed the concept in greater detail in the case-studies in The Limewood Sculptors of Renaissance Germany (1980) and Patterns of Intention (1985).

== See also ==
- Renaissance art
