= List of Renaissance structures =

The following is a list of notable Renaissance structures.

== Belgium ==
- Antwerp City Hall

== Czech Republic ==
- Château of Litomyšl
- Villa Belvedere in Prague
- Castle of Český Krumlov

== Denmark ==
- Kronborg Castle
- Rosenborg Castle
- Børsen
- Frederiksborg Palace

== England ==
- Hampton Court Palace, from 1514 onwards
- Hengrave Hall, Suffolk
- Sutton Place, Surrey
- Elizabethan prodigy houses:

Burghley House, Cambridgeshire
Longleat House, Wiltshire (1567–1580)
Hatfield House, Hertfordshire
Wollaton Hall, Nottingham
Hardwick Hall, Derbyshire
Longford Castle, Wiltshire
Castle Ashby House, Northamptonshire
Montacute House, Somerset
Bramshill House, Hampshire
Aston Hall, Birmingham
Charlton Park, Wiltshire
Barrington Court, Somerset, early Elizabethan E plan
Astley Hall, Chorley, Lancashire
Doddington Hall, Lincolnshire
Fountains Hall, North Yorkshire, built with stone from Fountains Abbey next door
Charlton House, London, relatively modest, to house James I's young son
East Barsham Manor, Norfolk
Burton Constable Hall, Yorkshire (exterior)

- Banqueting House, London (1619–1622)
- Queen's House, Greenwich, London (1616–1617)
- Canterbury Quadrangle, St John's College, Oxford

== France ==
- Château d'Amboise
- Château de Blois
- Château de Chambord
- Château de Châteaubriant
- Château de Chenonceau
- Château de Fontainebleau
- Château de Laval
- Hôtel d'Assézat
- Louvre

== Germany ==
- Schloss Johannisburg
- Ahrensburg Castle
- Augsburg Town Hall
- Bremen City Hall
- Cologne City Hall
- Düsseldorf City Hall
- Heidelberg Castle
- Leipzig City Hall
- Munich Residenz
- Schwerin Castle

== Hungary ==
- Visegrád, Royal Summer Palace
- Bakócz Chapel in Esztergom

== Italy ==
- Bergamo, Colleoni Chapel
- Brescia, Palazzo della Loggia
- Florence
  - Dome of Santa Maria del Fiore (by Filippo Brunelleschi)
  - Ospedale degli Innocenti (by Filippo Brunelleschi)
  - Sagrestia Vecchia (by Filippo Brunelleschi)
  - Basilica di San Lorenzo di Firenze (by Filippo Brunelleschi)
  - Santo Spirito (by Filippo Brunelleschi)
  - Pazzi Chapel at Basilica di Santa Croce (by Filippo Brunelleschi)
  - Palazzo Medici (by Michelozzo)
  - Palazzo Pitti (unknown architect)
  - Palazzo Strozzi
  - Façade of Santa Maria Novella (by L.B. Alberti)
  - Palazzo Rucellai (by L.B. Alberti)
  - Uffizi (by Giorgio Vasari)
- Rimini, Tempio Malatestiano (by Leon Battista Alberti)
- Mantua
  - Sant'Andrea (by Leon Battista Alberti)
  - Palazzo Te (by Giulio Romano)
- Urbino, Palazzo Ducale (by Luciano Laurana)
- Milan
  - Santa Maria presso San Satiro (by Bramante)
  - Santa Maria delle Grazie (by Bramante)
- Rome
  - Capitoline Museums (by Michelangelo)
  - Palazzo Farnese (by Giuliano da Sangallo the Younger and Michelangelo)
  - San Pietro in Montorio (by Bramante)
  - Cloister of Santa Maria della Pace (by Bramante)
  - Villa Farnesina
- Villa Farnese, Caprarola (by Giacomo Barozzi da Vignola)
- Urbino
  - Ducal Palace
- Venice
  - Loggetta of St. Mark's Campanile (by Jacopo Sansovino?)
  - Palazzo Dolfin Manin (by Jacopo Sansovino)
  - Biblioteca Marciana (by Jacopo Sansovino)
  - Scuola Grande di San Marco
- Vicenza
  - Basilica Palladiana
  - Villa Capra "La Rotonda" (by A. Palladio)

== Lithuania ==
- Biržai Castle
- Panemunė Castle
- Radziwill Palace in Vilnius
- Raudondvaris Palace
- Royal Palace of Lithuania (or the Lower Castle) in Vilnius
- St. Michael's Church in Vilnius

== Netherlands ==
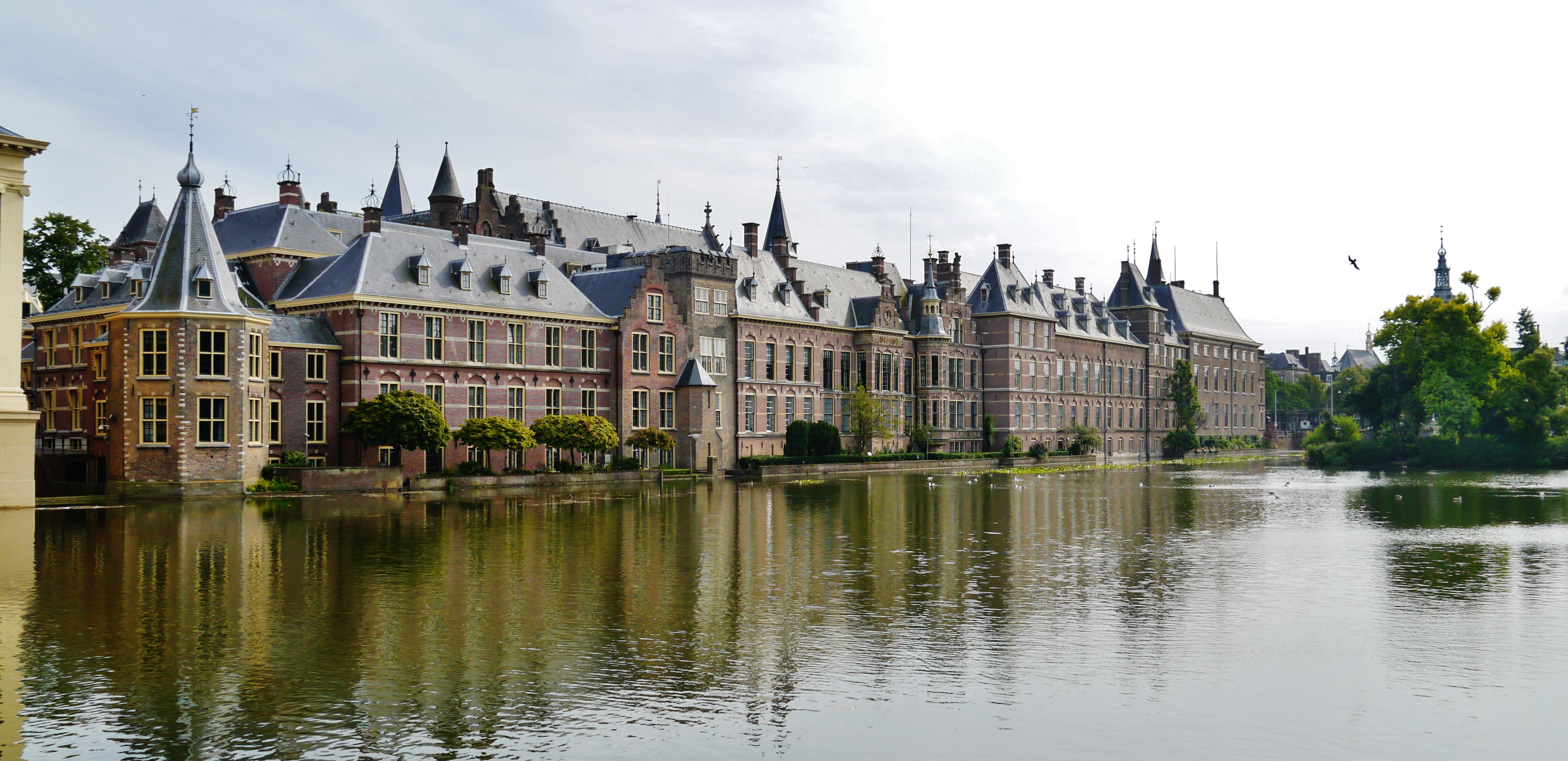
The Binnenhof in The Hague

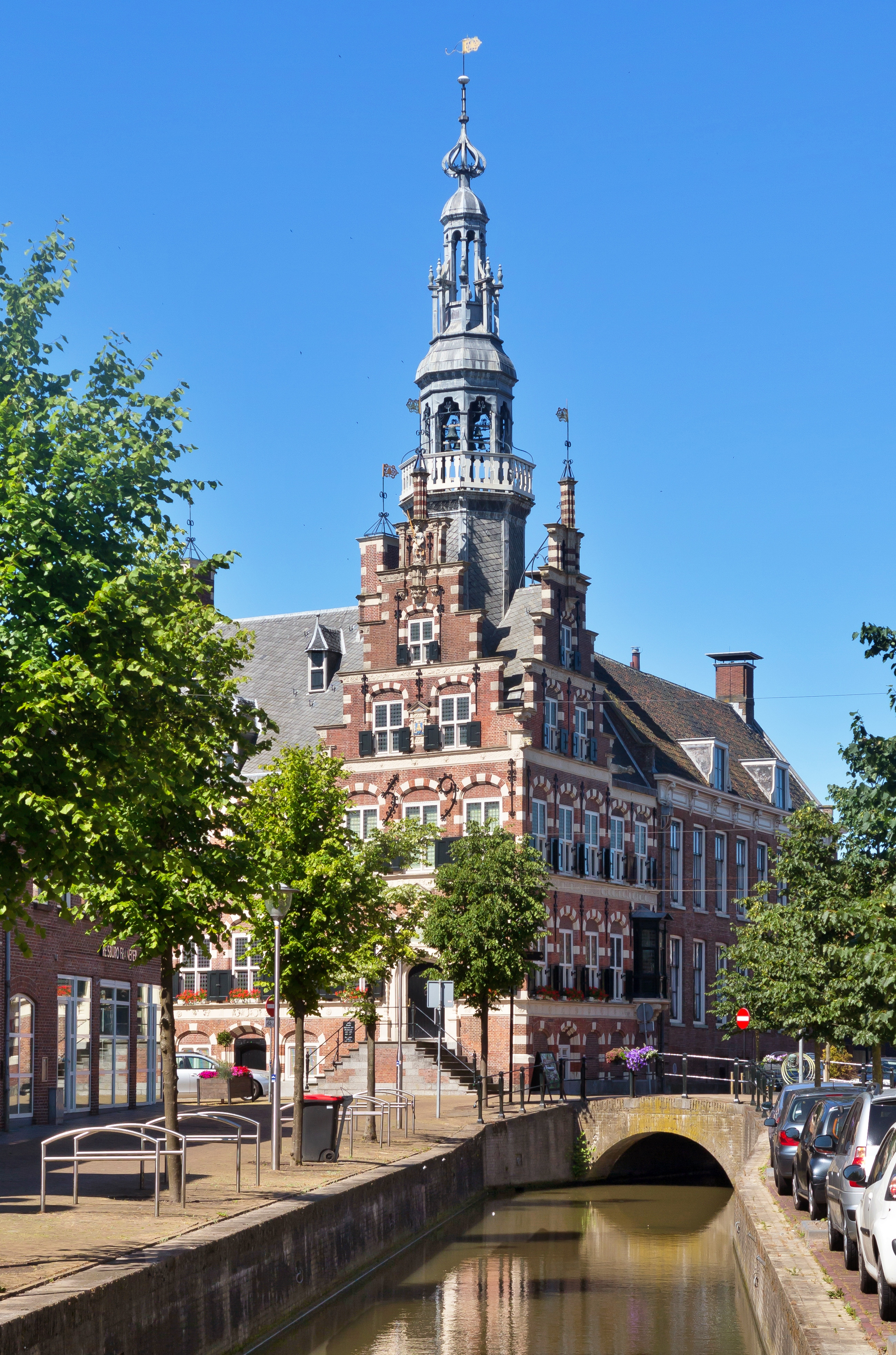
The Franeker City Hall in the Netherlands

- Binnenhof
- Franeker City Hall
- Huis met de Hoofden
- Hoensbroek Castle
- Montelbaanstoren
- Munttoren
- Noorderkerk
- Oost-Indisch Huis
- Old City Hall (The Hague)
- Delft City Hall
- Haarlem City Hall
- Vleeshal
- Waag (Alkmaar)
- Waag, Amsterdam
- Waag, Haarlem
- Westerkerk
- Zuiderkerk
- Oosterkerk (Hoorn)

== Poland ==
- Wawel Castle in Kraków
- Sigismund's Chapel at Wawel Cathedral in Kraków
- Old City of Zamość
- Cathedral in Zamość
- Cloth Hall in Kraków
- Poznań Town Hall
- Town Hall in Chełmno
- Krasiczyn Castle
- Brzeg Castle
- Pieskowa Skała Castle
- Firlej Chapel in Bejsce
- Loitz house in Szczecin
- Houses and parish church in Kazimierz Dolny
- Great Armoury in Gdańsk
- Highland Gate in Gdańsk
- Green Gate in Gdańsk
- Castle in Drzewica
- Baranów Sandomierski Castle
- Jesuit Church, Warsaw
- Town Hall in Chełmno
- Castle in Płakowice near Lwówek Śląski
- Pruszków Castle
- Niemodlin Castle
- Castle in Siedlisko

== Portugal ==
- Cloister of John III in Convent of the Order of Christ, in Tomar
- Church of Nossa Senhora da Graça, in Évora

== Russia ==
- Archangel Cathedral of the Moscow Kremlin

== Scotland ==
- Stirling Castle
- Falkland Palace
- Claypotts Castle
- Winton Castle
- Drumlanrig Castle

== Spain ==
- El Escorial (by Juan Bautista de Toledo and Juan de Herrera)
- New Cathedral of Salamanca (by Juan de Álava and others)
- Palace of Monterrey in Salamanca (by Rodrigo Gil de Hontañón)
- Arzobispo Fonseca College in Salamanca (by Diego de Siloé, Juan de Álava and R. G. de Hontañón)
- Convent of St. Stephen in Salamanca, (by Juan de Álava and R. G. de Hontañón)
- Palace of Guzmanes in León (by R. G. de Hontañón)
- Hospital de la Santa Cruz in Toledo (by Enrique Egas and Alonso de Covarrubias)
- Hospital Tavera, in Toledo (by Bartolomé Bustamante)
- Hospital Real, in Granada (by Enrique Egas)
- Palace of Charles V in Granada (by Pedro Machuca)
- Cathedral of Granada (by Juan Gil de Hontañón, Enrigue Egas and Diego de Siloé)
- Cathedral of Jaén (by Andrés de Vandelvira)
- Cathedral of Baeza (by Vandelvira)
- University of Alcalá de Henares (by Rodrigo Gil de Hontañón and others)
- Hostal de los Reyes Católicos of Santiago de Compostela (by Enrique Egas)

== Sweden ==
- Gripsholm Castle, Mariefred
- Kalmar Castle, Kalmar
