= Ascanio Piccolomini =

Ascanio Piccolomini may refer to:

- Ascanio I Piccolomini (died 1597), archbishop of Siena, 1588–1597
- Ascanio II Piccolomini (1590–1671), archbishop of Siena, 1629–1671
