= Chimenti =

Chimenti is an Italian surname. Notable people with the surname include:

- Antonio Chimenti, Italian football goalkeeper
- Jeff Chimenti, American musician
- Chimenti Camicia, Italian renaissance period artist
- Jacopo da Empoli, born as Jacopo Chimenti
