= Ascanio I Piccolomini =

Roman Catholic prelate

Most Reverend Ascanio Piccolomini
- Archbishop of Siena
- Church: Catholic Church
- In office: 1588–1597
- Predecessor: Francesco Bandini Piccolomini
- Successor: François-Marie Tarugi

Orders
- Consecration: 11 September 1579 by Spinello Benci

Personal details
- Died: 13 May 1597 Siena, Italy

Ascanio Piccolomini (died 13 May 1597) was a Roman Catholic prelate who served as Archbishop of Siena (1588–1597) and Titular Archbishop of Colossae (1579–1588).

== Biography ==
On 3 July 1579, Ascanio Piccolomini was appointed during the papacy of Pope Gregory XIII as Coadjutor Archbishop of Siena and Titular Archbishop of Colossae. On 11 September 1579, he was consecrated bishop by Spinello Benci, Bishop of Montepulciano, with Claudio Borghese, Bishop of Grosseto, and Francesco Maria Piccolomini, Bishop of Pienza, serving as co-consecrators. In 1588, he succeeded to the bishopric of Siena. He served as Archbishop of Siena until his death on 13 May 1597.

While bishop, he was the principal co-consecrator of Antonio Fera, Bishop of Marsico Nuovo (1584).

== External links and additional sources ==
- Cheney, David M. "Archdiocese of Siena-Colle di Val d'Elsa-Montalcino". Catholic-Hierarchy.org. (for Chronology of Bishops) ^{[self-published]}
- Chow, Gabriel. "Metropolitan Archdiocese of Siena–Colle di Val d'Elsa–Montalcino (Italy)". GCatholic.org. (for Chronology of Bishops) ^{[self-published]}

Catholic Church titles
Preceded by	Titular Archbishop of Colossae; 1579–1588	Succeeded by Giuseppe Ferrerio
Preceded by Francesco Bandini Piccolomini	Archbishop of Siena; 1588–1597	Succeeded by François-Marie Tarugi
