= Chimenti Camicia =

Italian renaissance architect

Chimenti Camicia was an Italian renaissance architect who was born in Florence in 1431. He had his own workshop by 1464. In 1479 he went to work for King Matthias Corvinus of Hungary for whom Camicia designed palaces, gardens, fountains, churches, and fortifications. He also supervised the rebuilding of Buda Castle.
