= Spinello Benci =

16th-century Italian Catholic bishop

Spinello Benci (died 10 August 1596) was an Italian Catholic bishop.

== Life ==
Born in Montepulciano, he embarked on an ecclesiastical career, becoming archpriest of the pieve of Montepulciano as a praelatura nullius. When that archpresbytery was turned into a diocese in 1561, he endowed the episcopal mensa with the archpresbytery's benefices and on 9 January 1562 Pope Pius IV made him its first bishop.

During his episcopate he decided to demolish the old collegiate church in the city, clearing the site for Montepulciano Cathedral.

Preceded by Giovanni Ricci (as apostolic administrator)	Bishop of Montepulciano; 9 January 1562 - 10 August 1596	Succeeded by Sinolfo Benci
