= Francesco Bandini Piccolomini =

Roman Catholic prelate

Most Reverend Francesco Bandini Piccolomini
- Archbishop of Siena
- Church: Catholic Church
- Archdiocese: Archdiocese of Siena
- In office: 1529–1588
- Predecessor: Giovanni Piccolomini
- Successor: Ascanio I Piccolomini

Orders
- Consecration: 25 October 1538

Personal details
- Born: 1505
- Died: 1588 (age 83) Siena, Italy

Francesco Bandini Piccolomini (1505–1588) was a Roman Catholic prelate who served as Archbishop of Siena (1529–1588).

== Biography ==
Francesco Bandini Piccolomini was born in 1505. On 7 April 1529, he was appointed during the papacy of Pope Clement VII as Archbishop of Siena. On 25 October 1538, he was consecrated bishop. He served as Archbishop of Siena until his death in 1588.

== External links and additional sources ==
- Cheney, David M. "Archdiocese of Siena-Colle di Val d'Elsa-Montalcino". Catholic-Hierarchy.org. (for Chronology of Bishops) ^{[self-published]}
- Chow, Gabriel. "Metropolitan Archdiocese of Siena–Colle di Val d'Elsa–Montalcino (Italy)". GCatholic.org. (for Chronology of Bishops) ^{[self-published]}

Catholic Church titles
Preceded by Giovanni Piccolomini	Archbishop of Siena; 1529–1588	Succeeded by Ascanio I Piccolomini
