= Moresque =

Plant-based ornament and decoration of the Renaissance

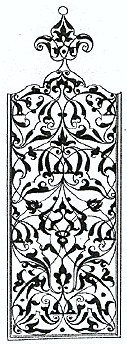
Moresque ornament print by Peter Flötner.

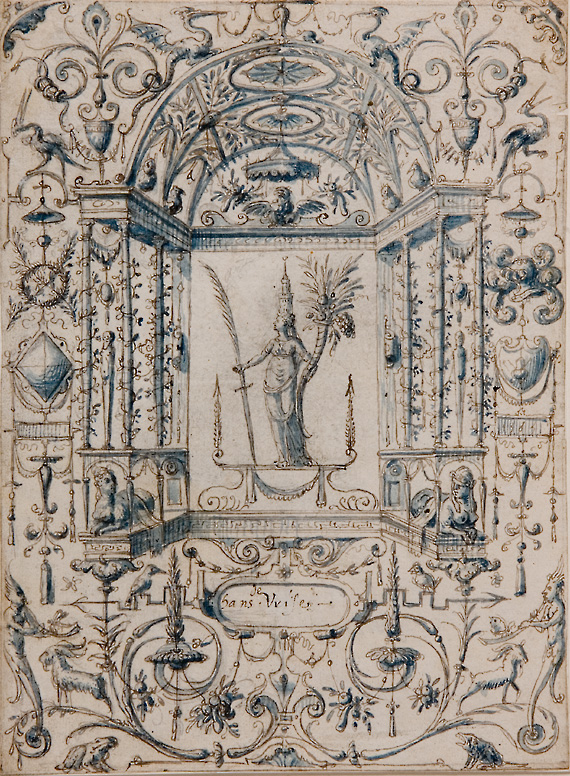
Mannerist grotesque ornament drawing by the Dutch painter and architect Hans Vredeman de Vries (1527–1609), of around 1604. The figures of the fauns at bottom, and almost the dragons at top, are moresques in the figure sense.

Moresque is an obsolete alternative term to "Moorish" in English, and in the arts has some specific meanings. By itself, the word is used to describe the stylized plant-based forms of tendrils and leaves found in ornament and decoration in the applied arts in Renaissance Europe that are derived from the arabesque patterns of Islamic ornament. Like their Islamic ancestors, they differ from the typical European plant scroll in being many-branched and spreading rather than forming a line in one direction. The use of half-leaves with their longest side running along the stem is typical for both.

First found in 15th-century Italy, especially Venice, moresques continue in the Mannerist and Northern Mannerist styles of the 16th century.

== Etymology ==
The term is ultimately derived from the name of the Moors, a historic people in the western Mediterranean. Other similarly derived words include Blackamoor, Kammermohr, Matamoros, Maure, Mohr im Hemd, Moresca, Moresche, Moreška, Morianbron, Morisco, Moros y cristianos, and Morris dance.

== Figures ==
Another, related, meaning was defined in 1611 by Randle Cotgrave's A Dictionarie of the French and English Tongues as: "a rude or anticke painting, or carving, wherin the feet and tayles of beasts, &c, are intermingled with, or made to resemble, a kind of wild leaves, &c." The word was also used for such a figure, starting off as a human or animal, but terminating as part of a decorative scheme of foliage or geometric strapwork.

In fact the origin of figures like those described by Cotgrave comes not from the Islamic world, but from the Renaissance version, influenced by the Ancient Roman grotesque decorative style, of medieval ornament, especially that found in illuminated manuscripts. Here men and beasts whose forms disappear into geometric or foliage decoration go back almost a thousand years to the interlace of Insular art seen in the Book of Kells and other manuscripts. These themselves derive from the Animal style of barbarian Europe. However, the term moresque is not used of these medieval versions.

== Book covers ==
Tooled and decorated fine bookbindings and printer's ornaments marking the end of a chapter were one of the first places where the style appeared, in 15th century Italy. Moresque decoration remained a common element in decorated book bindings throughout the 16th century, and across Europe, often combined with strapwork or bandwork.

== Other meanings ==
- "Moresque dance" is a fancy term for the English Morris dance (OED, quoting Chambers' Cyclopaedia, or Universal Dictionary of Arts and Sciences, 1727). See also the Renaissance Moresca dances of France and Italy, called "moresques" in French.
- Hispano-Moresque ware is a type of medieval and Renaissance fine pottery produced in Spain by both Muslims and Christians.
- The term "Hispano-Moresque" is also used to describe figured silk textiles with geometric patterns woven in medieval Andalusia.
- In 18th century French, moresques were "large loose comfortable pantaloons of thin printed calico".

== See also ==
- Morisco
