= Kammermohr =

Early modern German term for Black servants

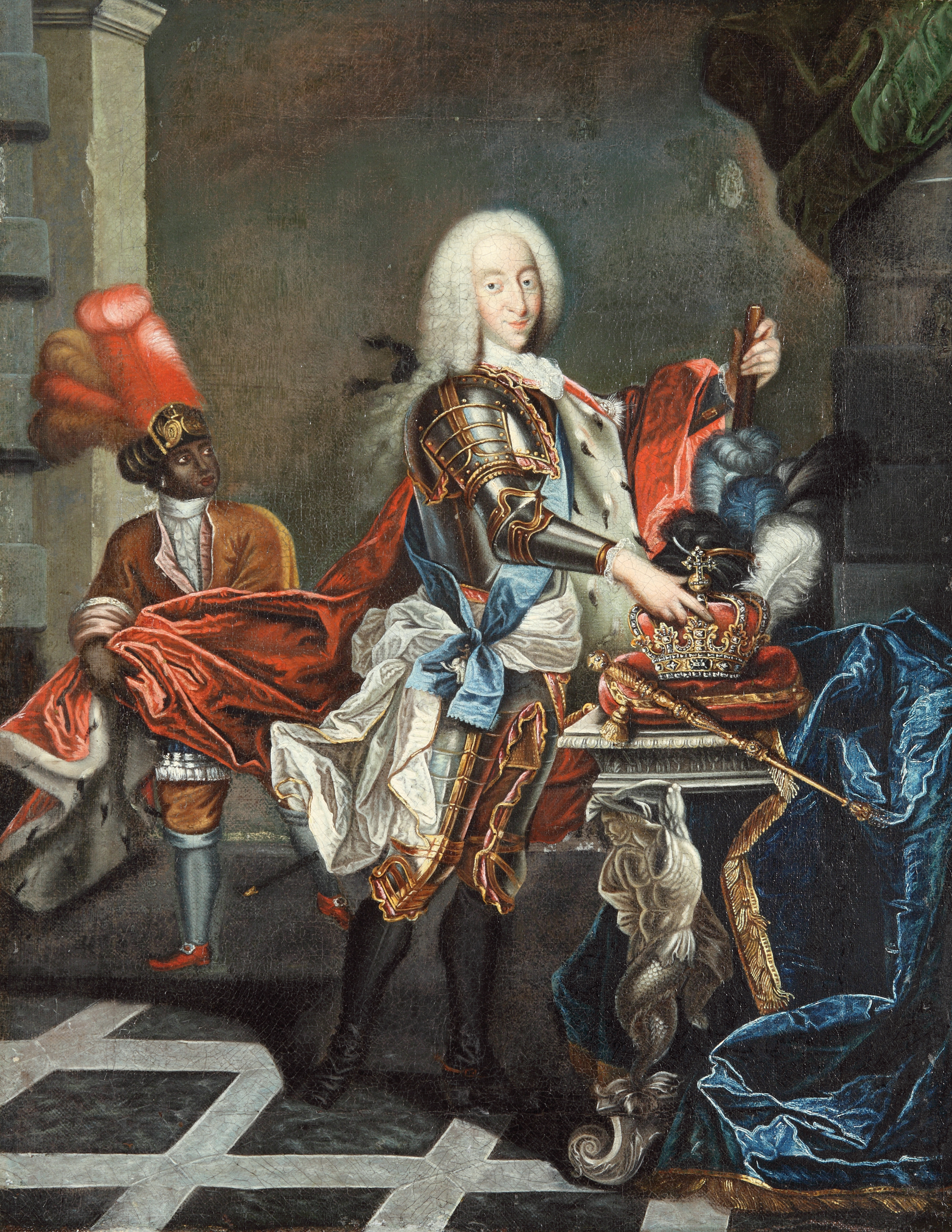
Portrait of Christian VI of Denmark with a Kammermohr

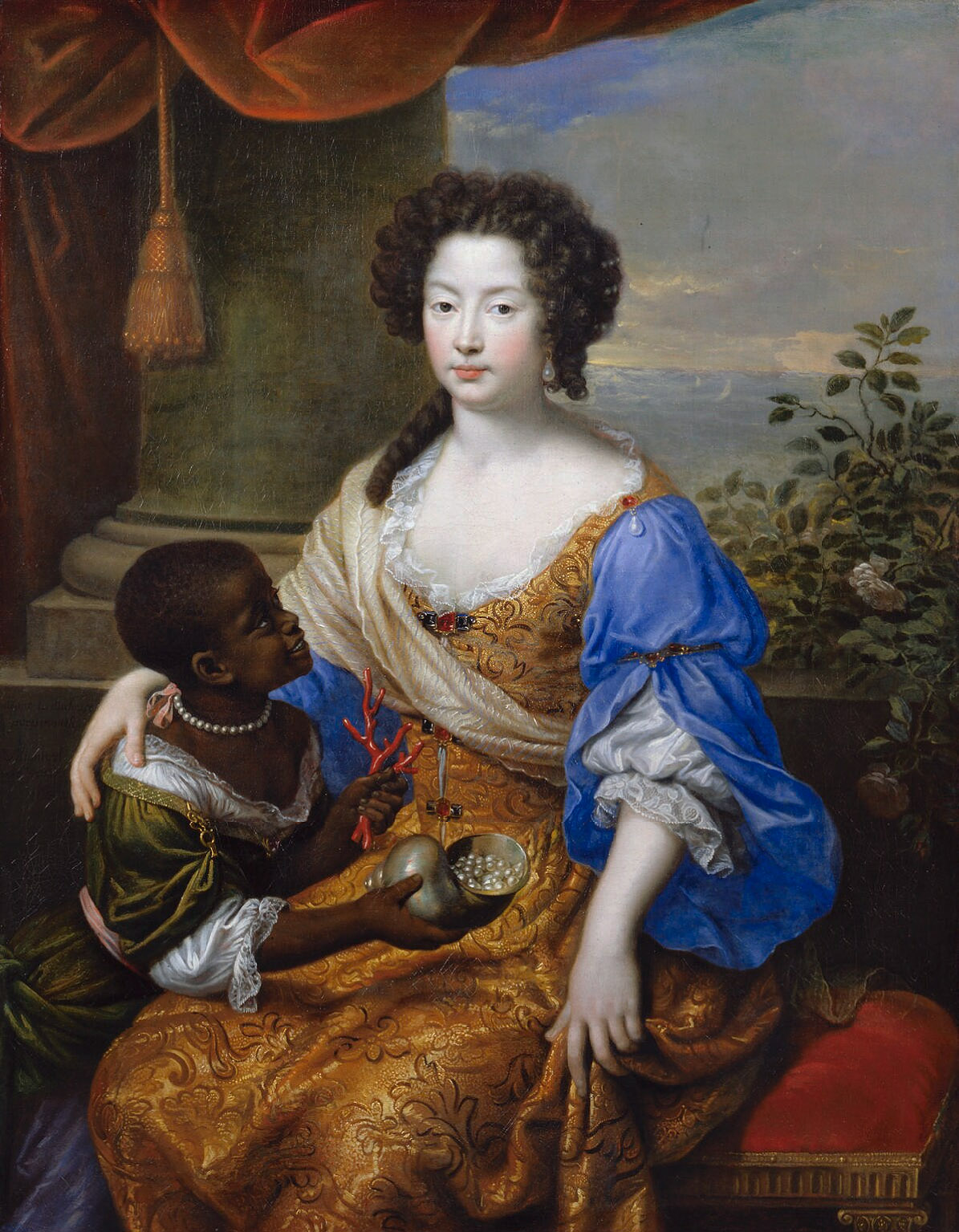
Portrait of the Duchess of Portsmouth with a Kammermohr

Kammermohr (or Hofmohr; pl. Kammermohren, lit. "chamber-moor") is a German term that was used during the early modern era to refer to Black servants in upper class households such as those of the royalty, nobility or clergy.

== History ==
People of black skin colour from the Orient, Africa and America had often been taken to Europe as valets during the time of colonialism. This became common in the 16th-century and continued to be fashionable until the early 19th-century. The term Kammermohr was first used as an official term in a court protocol in 1747 in Saxony.

The decorated Kammermohr, often in livery, served a ruler, church dignitaries or wealthy merchants as an object of prestige and as a status symbol, showcasing their wealth and luxury lifestyle. Above all, however, the valets symbolized the worldwide relations of their employer.

== Etymology ==
'Kammer' is the German word for chamber, in particular the private rooms of a wealthy person. 'Mohr' is ultimately derived from the name for the Moors, a historic people in the western Mediterranean who originated from northern Africa during the Middle Ages. (The dictionary Duden has since 2012 described the word 'Mohr' as often being seen as discriminatory, and since 2019 as "obsolete, today discriminatory".)

Hence, 'Kammermohr' would translate to 'chamber Moor'.

Other similarly derived words include Blackamoor, Matamoros, Maure, Mauretania, Mohr im Hemd, Moresca, Moresche, Moresque, Moreška, Morianbron, Morisco, Moros y cristianos, and Morris dance.

== Notable examples ==
- Anton Wilhelm Amo, kammermohr of Anthony Ulrich, Duke of Brunswick-Wolfenbüttel.
- Adriaan de Bruin, kammermohr
- Angelo Soliman, kammermohr of Austrian Emperor Joseph II.
- Ignatius Fortuna, kammermohr of Countess Palatine Francisca Christina of Sulzbach
- Gustav Badin, kammermohr of first Queen Louisa Ulrika of Sweden and then Princess Sophia Albertine of Sweden.
- Abraham Petrovich Hannibal, kammermohr of Peter the Great

== See also ==
- Chamberlain (office)
- Court dwarf
- Court Jew
- Kizlar agha
- Ellen More
- Zwarte Piet
