= Igelbäcken =

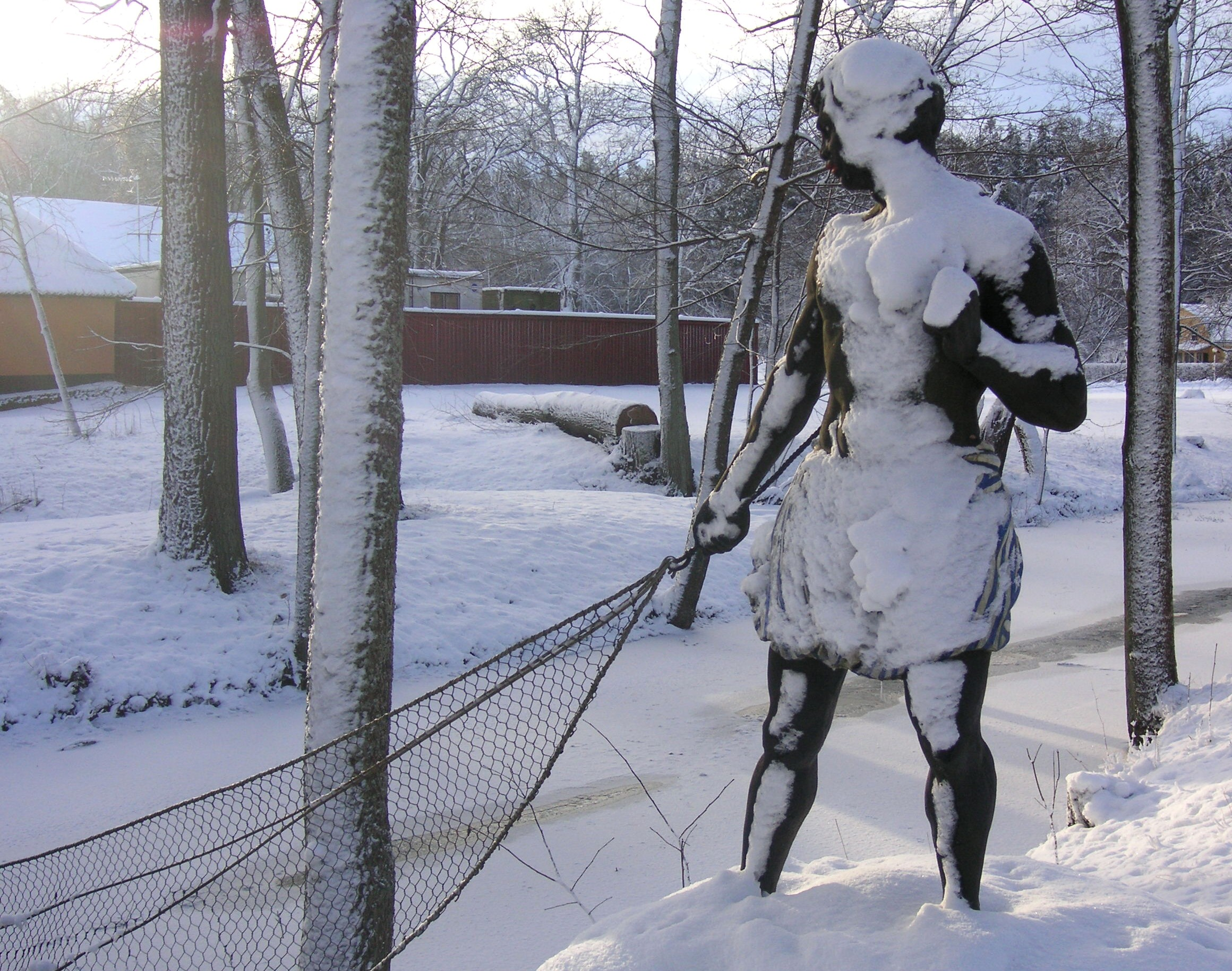
- One of the two Blackamoors standing by the bridge Morianbron.

Location
- Country: Sweden

Physical characteristics
- Source
  - location: Säbysjön
  - coordinates: 59°25′40″N 17°52′22″E
  - elevation: 17 m (56 ft)
- Mouth
  - location: Edsviken
  - coordinates: 59°23′21″N 18°0′59″E
  - elevation: ~0 m (0 ft)
- Length: 10 km (6.2 mi)
- Basin size: 14.58 km^{2} (5.63 sq mi)
- Discharge
  - average: 1.4 L/s (0.049 cu ft/s) (low), 600 L/s (21 cu ft/s) (max)

Igelbäcken (Swedish: (the) Leech Stream) is a small stream in northern Stockholm, Sweden. The drainage area, part of the Royal National City Park and divided into several nature reserves, is shared by the municipalities of Järfälla, Sollentuna, Solna, Stockholm, and Sundbyberg.

== Watershed ==
Stretching more than 10 kilometres west to east from Säbysjön in Järfälla to Edsviken near the Ulriksdal Palace, Igelbäcken's main feeder is the stream Djupanbäcken carrying water from the small lake Djupan. Due to the location in the national park, its untouched character, and to the rare population of Stone Loach, Igelbäcken is considered one of the most valuable water bodies in Stockholm. Nevertheless, samples taken in 2001 showed levels of phosphorus and nitrogen were moderate while levels of metals were increasing between the stream's origin and mouth. The municipalities sharing the catchment area, together with the county administrative board have initiated various project to enhance the natural value of the river and the surrounding green areas. For example, in 2006 Solna and Sundbyberg declared their ambitions to transform the central part of the stream from a straight ditch to a meandering river murmuring over stones, overshadowed by trees and flanked by wetlands intended to attract amphibians and waders; a project partly financed by the Swedish state.

The upper part of the watershed is constituted of Norra Järvafältet, an open-air area characterized by moraine ridges covered with forests separated by water meadows and tilled fields. While some 20 hectares of the surrounding area is used for pasture, the stream is bordered by deciduous plants such as Alder and Birch and Bulrush can be found in non-shadowed patches. Some 2,5 kilometres from its origin, the stream passes down in a culvert under a traffic route (Akallavägen) and the Barkarby Airport before merging with the stream Djupanbäcken. This part of the catchment area contains a motocross track, a golf driving range, a closed dump, and receives stormwater from the E18 traffic route. Thereafter, the stream flows some 4 km in the valley separating the suburbs Akalla-Hjulsta and Tensta-Rinkeby and where are several rural structures including an ecological farm (Hästa Gård), eight allotment-gardens, and some minor overgrown wetlands. East of the valley the river is crossed by a second traffic route (Kymlingelänken) before flowing 2,5 km through an open grassland to reach a railway and the E4 traffic route, water from the latter treated in a local cleaning plant. The last 1.4 km passes more allotment-gardens and the gardens of the Ulriksdal Palace before jumping into Edsviken through a low dam.

=== Environmental influence ===
In the early 1970s, the stream lost almost a third of its watershed below lake Säbysjön in connection with the construction of a drainage system for the surrounding suburbs. Water leaking into the stormwater tunnel further diminishes the inflow of groundwater. Furthermore, a by-product of the construction of these suburbs were the contaminated tips still located in the catchment area. Though the inflow from Lake Säbysjän remains poorly documented, the lake is known to be rich in nutrients and consequently levels of phosphorus and nitrogen are high in the stream. Below the lake, the drainage area itself brings 120 kg/year of phosphorus and 3.300 kg/year of nitrogen, most of which comes from unsettled and cultivated terrain, a leakage reduced by keeping uncultivated zones next to the watercourse. Contributions of metals, such as zinc and copper, are brought to the stream from the surround open terrain and the landfill deposits in the catchment area. While levels of cadmium, copper, zinc, and nickel were reported as increased in ditches draining these deposits, levels of oil, PCB, and chlorinated hydrocarbons were reported as insignificant.

== Flora and fauna ==
Major stands of greater spearwort are found in the central valley with minor occurrences both up- and downstream. Next to the poor running waters near Ulriksdal Palace are intermediate water-starwort and further upstream two-metre tall great willowherb is found along the shores as are instances of blue water-speedwell. Some rare plants along the stream include greater pond-sedge, true fox-sedge, and cyperus-like sedge.

Samples of bottom fauna near the palace in 1994 documented an abundance of species of Oligochaeta, including a new species, Fridericia ulrikae. Rake samples in 1998 documented more than a hundred species, a biodiversity explained by the oxygen feed produced by increased water flow that year, most of whom were insensitive to pollution. Two species considered Near Threatened were also documented (the caddisfly Tricholeiochiton fagesii and the freshwater gastropod Aplexa hypnorum).

One of the most notable species in the stream is the rare stone loach (Barbatula barbatula) attracted by the strong current and stony bottom of the stream. During dry periods sections of Igelbäcken dry up which is the most important threat to the fish. While its presence in the stream is still considered as threatened, the numbers of individuals increased during the period 1999-2001. Other fishes in the stream include perch, northern pike, roach, tench, crucian carp, and, more rarely, trout. European crayfish were observed in 1989 and signal crayfish, illegally introduced during the 1990s, is feared to threaten the population of stone loach and to bring crayfish plague into the stream.

Numerous birds, such as thrush nightingale, common snipe, and Eurasian woodcock, breed along the stream, and species feeding in and around it include white-throated dipper, herons, and lesser spotted woodpecker. The cultivated grounds located along the central reach of the stream attract species such as long-eared owl, common kestrel, red-backed shrike, whinchat, and skylark. Goshawk breed in the surrounding pine forests.

No inventory of amphibians has been made in the stream itself, but most species common to the Stockholm area have been documented in the surrounding area with an abundant number of European vipers. Four species of bats were documented in 1197 near the central part of the stream: whiskered bat, common noctule, common pipistrelle, and northern bat.

== See also ==
- Geography of Stockholm
- Rivers of Sweden
