= Moresca =

15th/16th century dance and song

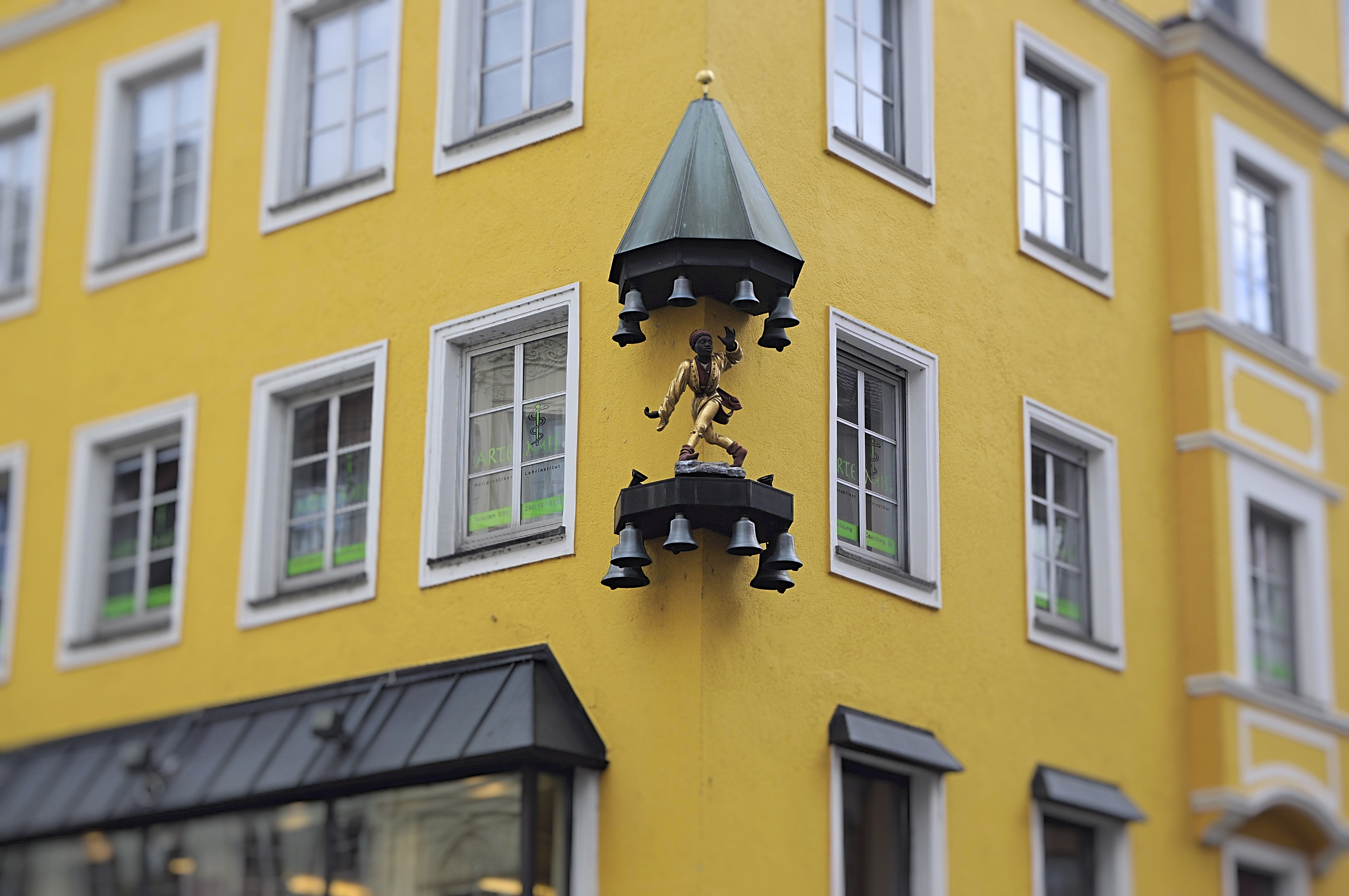
Carillon of a morris dancer over a jeweler in Munich

Moresca (Italian), morisca (Spanish), mourisca (Portuguese) or moresque, mauresque (French), also known in French as the danse des bouffons, is a dance of exotic character encountered in Europe in the Renaissance period. This dance usually took form of medieval wars in Spain between Moors and Christians and is related to the Spanish Moors and Christians festivals. Elements of moresca include blackening of the face, bells attached to the costumes and, in occasions, men disguised as women to portray fools. An example of the moresca can be seen in Franco Zeffirelli's 1968 production of Romeo and Juliet, which has a scene with both Juliet and Romeo dancing the moresca in a circle.

In the 15th century, the moresca is the most-often mentioned dance type in literature. On the rare occasions other dances (such as the basse danse, saltarello, or piva) are mentioned, the moresca is almost invariably described as well. In its early manifestation it appears in two forms: as a solo dance, and as a couple or group dance in which the dancers mime a sword combat between Christians and Muslims.

The moresca continues to be danced in Spain, Corsica, and Guatemala, and the name as well as certain characteristics of the choreography are related to the English Morris dance.)

The term moresca was also applied to ballet or pantomimic dance in opera by the 17th century. Some examples include: the moresca at the end of Monteverdi's Orfeo (1607). The ‘Entrée de' Mori’ at the end of Act 2 of Handel's Ariodante (1735) portrays an eccentric musical character that links it to the moresca tradition.

Moresca (Italian for: Moorish song) is also a musical genre that caricatured Black Africans. This genre is related to the villanella, a song that imitates lyric Neapolitan traditions of the street and countryside that became popular in the 1530s (see moresche, which is the Italian plural of moresca). This popular genre in 16th century had texts that parody the speech of Moors, later defined as Muslims or narrowly as inhabitants of the Barbary Coast. This genre originally had strong references to African style in music, like the accented eight notes and staccato rhythms.

== Etymology ==
The term is ultimately derived from the name of the Moors (from the Spanish Moros), a historic people in the western Mediterranean. Other similarly derived words include Blackamoor, Kammermohr, Matamoros, Maure, Mohr im Hemd, Moresche, Moresque, Moreška, Morianbron, Morisco, Moros y cristianos, and Morris dance.

== See also ==
- Moros y cristianos
- Italian folk dance
- Matachines
- Morris dance
- Weapon dance
