= Moresche (music) =

Renaissance music genre

Moresche is the plural of moresca, meaning Moorish thing, or Moorish girl in Italian. Both the singular and plural can refer to both a 15th~16th century dance genre or to a 15th~16th century song genre. This article concerns the genre of moresche, polyphonic "moorish" songs.

Moresche musically have no common heritage with the moresca dance form. Instead moresche are related to villanella and villanescas, stylized village songs for three to five voices. The significant difference relates to their texts – parodying the Italian spoken by African slaves in Italy. A related genre are greghesche, madrigals imitating Italian spoken by Greeks in Italy. The texts of moresche are often near untranslatable, due either to obscenity and double entendre, or nonsense language, or both.

The French singer and printer Antonio Barrè can claim the distinction of publishing the first known examples of moresche as partsongs in his Secondo libro delle muse a tre voci: canzoni moresche di diversi autori (Rome 1555). The Neapolitan moresca à 3 appeared only "after the canzone villanesca alla napolitana à 3 had gained a secure foothold" and can be considered a development of the villanesca from bucolic to more raucous subject matter; in text, language and musical idiom.

Chronologically, moresche belong the last years of Renaissance polyphonic song before monody and Baroque polyphony, and also on the cusp of change from the dominance in Italy of Flemish masters such as Adrian Willaert to native Italians such as Andrea Gabrieli.

== Etymology ==
The term is ultimately derived from the name of the Moors, a historic people in the western Mediterranean. Other similarly derived words include Blackamoor, Kammermohr, Matamoros, Maure, Mohr im Hemd, Moresca, Moresque, Moreška, Morianbron, Morisco, Moros y cristianos, and Morris dance.

== Composers of moresche ==
- Lassus: Libro de villanelle, moresche, et altre canzoni. 4–8vv (1582)
- Giaches de Wert
- Adrian Willaert
- Baldassare Donato
