= Raymond Park Apartments =

- U.S. National Register of Historic Places
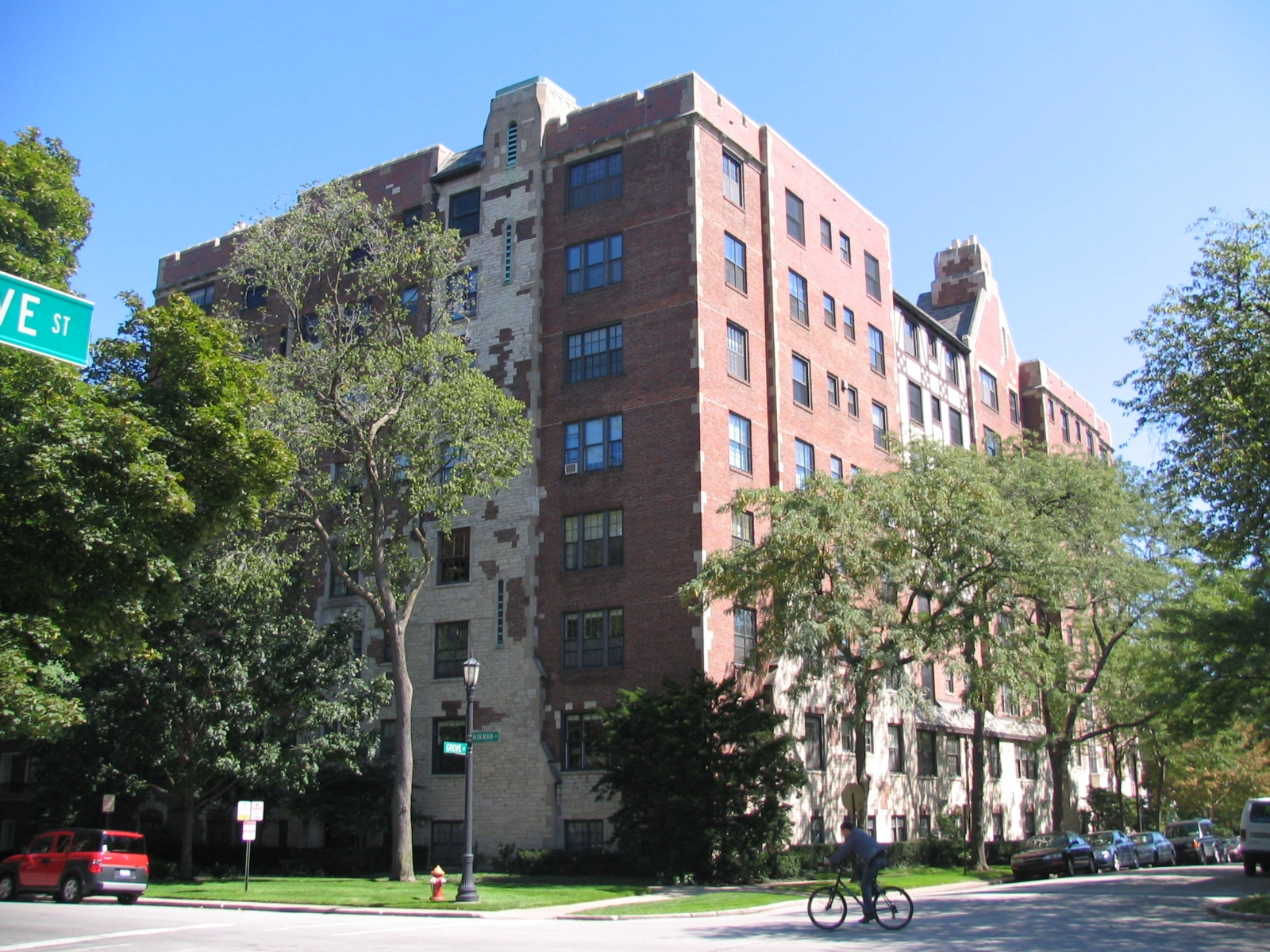
- Raymond Park Apartments in 2008

- Location within Chicago metropolitan area Location within Illinois Location within the United States
- Location: 1501 Hinman and 425 Grove, Evanston, Illinois
- Coordinates: 42°02′41″N 87°40′42″W
- Area: 0.4 acres (0.16 ha)
- Built: 1928
- Architect: Hall, Laurence & Ratcliffe
- Architectural style: Tudor Revival
- MPS: Suburban Apartment Buildings in Evanston TR
- NRHP reference No.: 85003581
- Added to NRHP: April 12, 2002

Raymond Park Apartments is a historic apartment building at the northeast corner of Hinman Avenue and Grove Street in Evanston, Illinois. The seven-story building was built in 1928; at the time, it was one of Evanston's largest residential apartments. Architects Hall, Laurence & Ratcliffe designed the building in the Tudor Revival style. The building has a brick exterior with sections of rough stone; the exterior is decorated with half-timbering and leadlight windows. The Tudor style is continued in the building's lobbies, which include strapwork, oak panels, and slate flooring.

The building was added to the National Register of Historic Places on April 12, 2002.
