= Martin Horváth =

Austrian writer and musician (born 1967)

- Born: 1967 (age 58–59); Vienna, Austria
- Occupations: Writer and Musician
- Writing career
- Years active: 1989-present

Martin Horváth is an Austrian writer and musician currently living in Vienna.

== Early life and education ==
Martin Horvath was born in 1967 in Vienna. He grew up with his 4 siblings in a teacher's family in the Großfeldsiedlung in Vienna. From 1985 to 1991, he studied at the University of Music and Performing Arts.

== Early writing ==
Martin Horváth began publishing short prose, essays, and other works in literary magazines and anthologies in 1989.

=== Buchkultur ===
Buchkultur is an Austrian literary magazine that published its first issue in 1989 and still publishes today. It began as a quarterly magazine that included book reviews, author interviews, information on book markets, etc. In its first issue, the magazine describes itself as a cross between a literary magazine and a classifieds publication for book stores. It says that part of its mission is to introduce its readers to more Austrian authors.

Michael Horváth, Martin Horváth’s brother, began with the magazine as the editor for the section on international book markets. Martin Horváth was a member of the editorial staff from 1989-1992 and was published by the magazine frequently. During his years in New York City, he was the magazine’s New York correspondent.

=== Jenseits des Schlussstrichs - Gedenkdienst im Diskurs über Österreichs nationalsozialistische Vergangenheit ===
This publication was the culmination of the Austrian Heritage Collection project, begun in 1996 and which was a collaboration of the Austrian Holocaust Memorial Service and the Leo Baeck Institute (New York City). The project had two goals: first, to document the stories of Austrian Jews who were expelled from Austria and who then emigrated to the USA, and second, to engage young Austrians in dialogue with former Austrians. Horváth participated in the data collection, conducting interviews and analyzing surveys. The book was published in 2002 by Horváth, Anton Legerer, Judith Pfeifer, and Stephan Roth. Horváth, in addition to editing the volume, also contributed an essay titled “Eine Art Wiedergutmachung: Begegnungen mit ehemaligen Österreicherinnen in New York” (“A Kind of Making-Up: Encounters with Former Austrians,” English translation not available.)

=== Other publications ===
“Der Tod der Euridice.” Blut in der Bassena. Mörderische Geschichten aus Wien. dtv, München: 1995 (as Julia Martins). Editor Michael Horvath.

Erweiterte Wohnzimmer: Leben im Wiener Kaffeehaus (1990), a book about the café scene in Vienna, Austria.

“Österreich zuerst.” Podium. Nr. 115/116.

== Novels ==
=== Mohr im Hemd, oder wie ich auszog, die Welt zu retten ===
Mohr im Hemd, oder wie ich auszog, die Welt zu retten (literal English translation: Moor in a Shirt, Or How I Set out to Save the World, not available in English, though) is named after a popular Viennese dessert with a controversial name. (A charity, SOS Mitmensch, began a campaign to change the name in 2012.) It was published by German publisher dtv in 2012 and is Horváth’s debut novel.

The novel centers around Ali, a 15-year-old asylum seeker living on the juvenile floor of an asylum home in Vienna, Austria. Ali speaks every language he encounters in the home, observes more events than are humanly possible, and delivers commentary upon all he hears and sees. Ali introduces the reader to a host of residents on the juvenile floor and the stories of how they arrived. Throughout the book, the reader learns of the various fates of these characters.

In 2005/06, Horváth completed training as a refugee assistant as part of his research for this novel. The subjects of immigration, asylum, etc., are important to him, and he intended to write a book with a message. He says, “In Austria, we’ve gotten used to foreigners being vilified, that politicians appeal to the lowest instincts. That makes me angry.”

Although an Austrian himself, Horváth published the book with a German publisher, because Austrian publishers turned it down. The book received generally positive reviews from various newspapers and online literary platforms, e.g.,. It was often labeled a picaresque novel and sometimes compared with Grimmelshausen’s Simplicius Simplicissimus. On Goodreads, it received 3.94/5 stars, with 17 ratings. On Lovely Books, a German online reading platform, it averaged 4/5 stars, with 24 ratings. On amazon.de, 4/5 stars, 16 ratings. All ratings as accessed March 7, 2018.

=== Future works ===
Horváth plans to write more (28) and in 2013/14 he began work on his second novel.

== Letter to Amazon ==
Horváth was one among a long list of authors (including Nobel Prize-winner Elfriede Jelinek) who wrote an open letter to Amazon CEO Jeff Bezos and Amazon German CEO Ralf Kleber, protesting how Amazon dealt with contract issues with the Sweden-based publisher Bonnier Group, which included Aladin, arsEdition, Berlin Verlag, Carlsen, Hörbuch Hamburg, Piper, Thienemann-Esslinger, and Ullstein. The letter, dated 2014, claims that Amazon was boycotting authors whose books appeared under these publishers, by not keeping enough copies in storage. Books from these publishing houses, according to the signatories, were being delivered slowly and omitted from Amazon’s recommendations. The letter further accused Amazon of giving the impression to customers that it didn’t interfere with book sales in this manner

== Music ==
Horváth plays the double-bass. and violon. He plays with the sirene Operntheater and with Ensemble Continuum. He has been playing as a freelance musician since 1988

He has played with the following orchestras:

- Radio-Symphonieorchester Wien
- Orchester der Wiener Staatsoper
- Orchester der Wiener Volksoper
- Österreichisch-Ungarische Haydnphilharmonie

He is also a member of the Merlin-Ensemble and the Styraburg Ensemble. He has played chamber music at the Salzburger Festspiele, Schubertiade Feldkirch, and Ferrara Musica.

== Awards and honours ==
- 2002 - Bruno Kreisky Recognition Award (8) for Jenseits des Schlussstrichs
- 2008 – Stipend for authors from the City of Vienna
- 2012 – Bruno Kreisky Recognition Award (28) for Mohr im Hemd
- 2013/2014 - State stipend for literature
- Author Award from the Austrian Cultural Ministry
