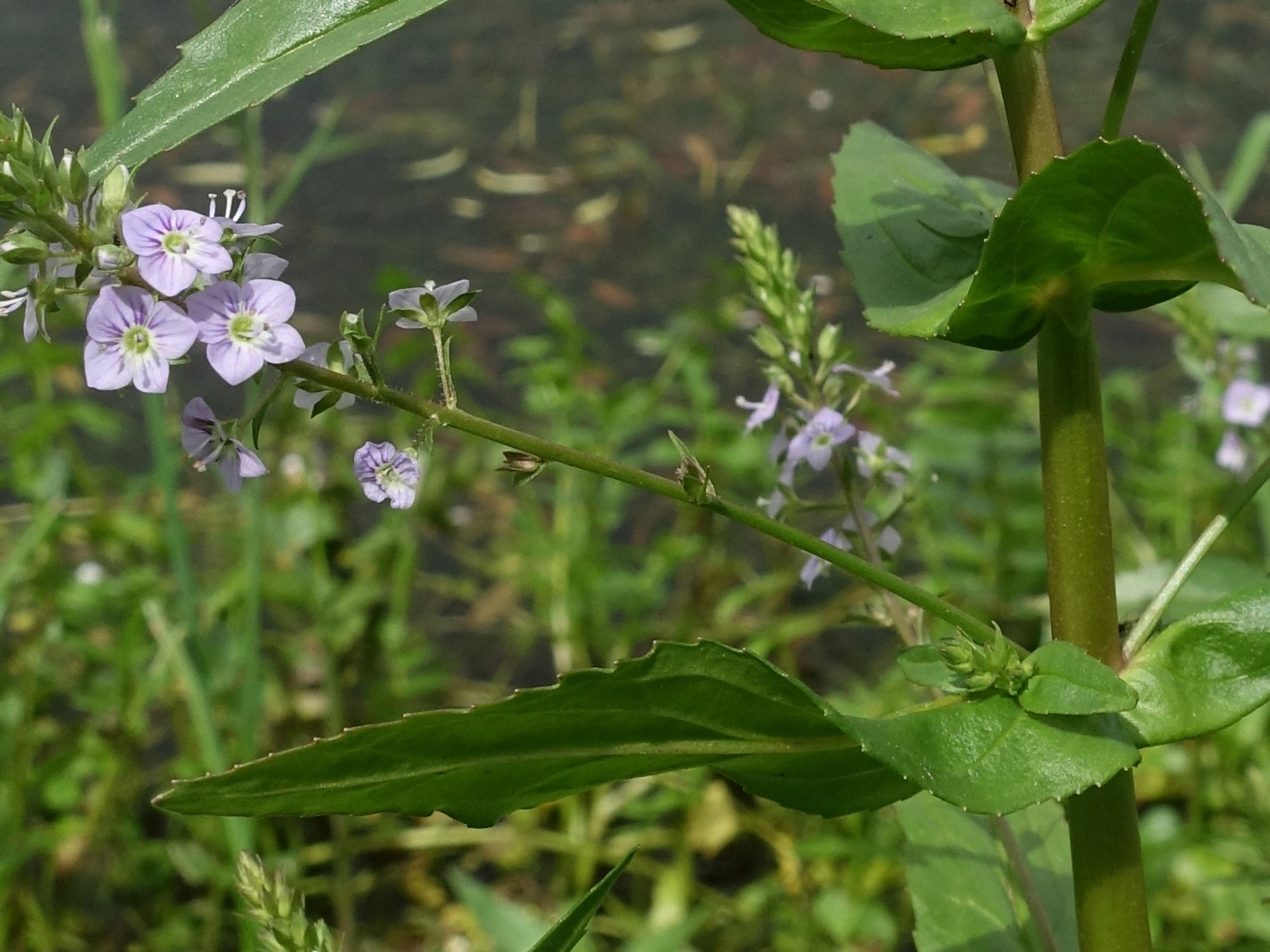
- In Ireland

Scientific classification
- Kingdom: Plantae
- Clade: Tracheophytes
- Clade: Angiosperms
- Clade: Eudicots
- Clade: Asterids
- Order: Lamiales
- Family: Plantaginaceae
- Genus: Veronica
- Species: V. × lackschewitzii

Binomial name
- Veronica × lackschewitzii J.Keller

Synonyms
- Veronica anagallis-aquatica subsp. lackschewitzii (J.Keller) B.Bock

= Veronica × lackschewitzii =

Species of flowering plant

Veronica × lackschewitzii, the hybrid water-speedwell or Lackschewitz's speedwell, is a hybrid species of flowering plant in the Plantaginaceae family occurring spontaneously throughout Europe and in parts of North America. It is named after Paul Lackschewitz (b. 1865).

== Description ==
This plant is a hybrid of Veronica anagallis-aquatica and Veronica catenata growing in damp to wet areas. It is frequent where the parents are both present and generally resembles them and is intermediate in features except it may grow far more robust and very tall (to 1.2 m, the parents being much shorter), with many flowering stems (up to 70), floral spikes longer than either of the parents with far more flowers (an average of (30)60(90) flowers each); the flowers are blue to lilac as with Veronica anagallis-aquatica. It is highly infertile with fruits very rare, an indicator of its hybrid identity, however any seeds that do form are more fertile and may then cross with the parents to produce children that are more fertile. Although sterile, plants can reproduce vegetatively by rooting readily at the nodes, and by stolons, so that you may get large populations, sometimes replacing the parents over large areas.

A photograph can be seen on iNaturalist.

Similar species include Veronica anagallis-aquatica, Veronica catenata, Veronica anagalloides, Veronica scardica and Veronica beccabunga.

== Range and altitude ==
It is found throughout much of Europe, and has been introduced into North America, where V. catenata is native, but V. anagallis-aquatica is a naturalised alien.
