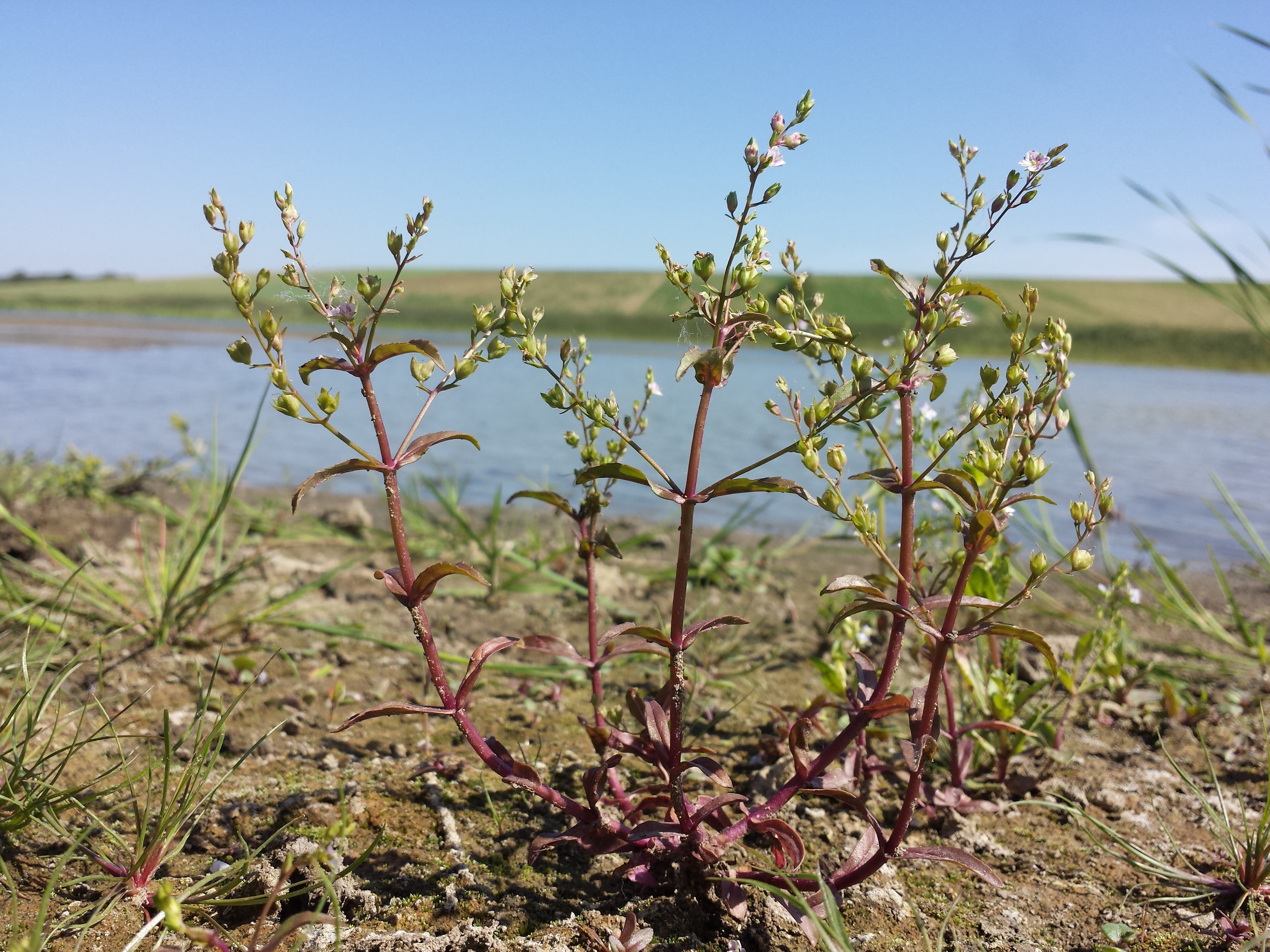
- In Austria

Conservation status
- Least Concern (IUCN 3.1)

Scientific classification
- Kingdom: Plantae
- Clade: Tracheophytes
- Clade: Angiosperms
- Clade: Eudicots
- Clade: Asterids
- Order: Lamiales
- Family: Plantaginaceae
- Genus: Veronica
- Species: V. catenata

Binomial name
- Veronica catenata Pennell

= Veronica catenata =

Species of flowering plant

Veronica catenata, the pink water speedwell, is a species of flowering plant in the family Plantaginaceae. It is native to Canada, the United States, Europe, the Azores, and northern Africa. As its common name implies, it prefers growing in or near marshes, rivers, lakes and ponds.

== Description ==
A perennial branching herbaceous plant with erect and creeping stems, the latter rooting freely at the nodes. It grows to about 30 cm (12 in) tall with green to purplish stems, usually glabrous but sometimes hairy. Plants occur on bare ground around ponds and in wetland areas, after the water has receded, or in open (usually still) water. Underwater plants are brownish in colour and have a different appearance to the terrestrial plants.

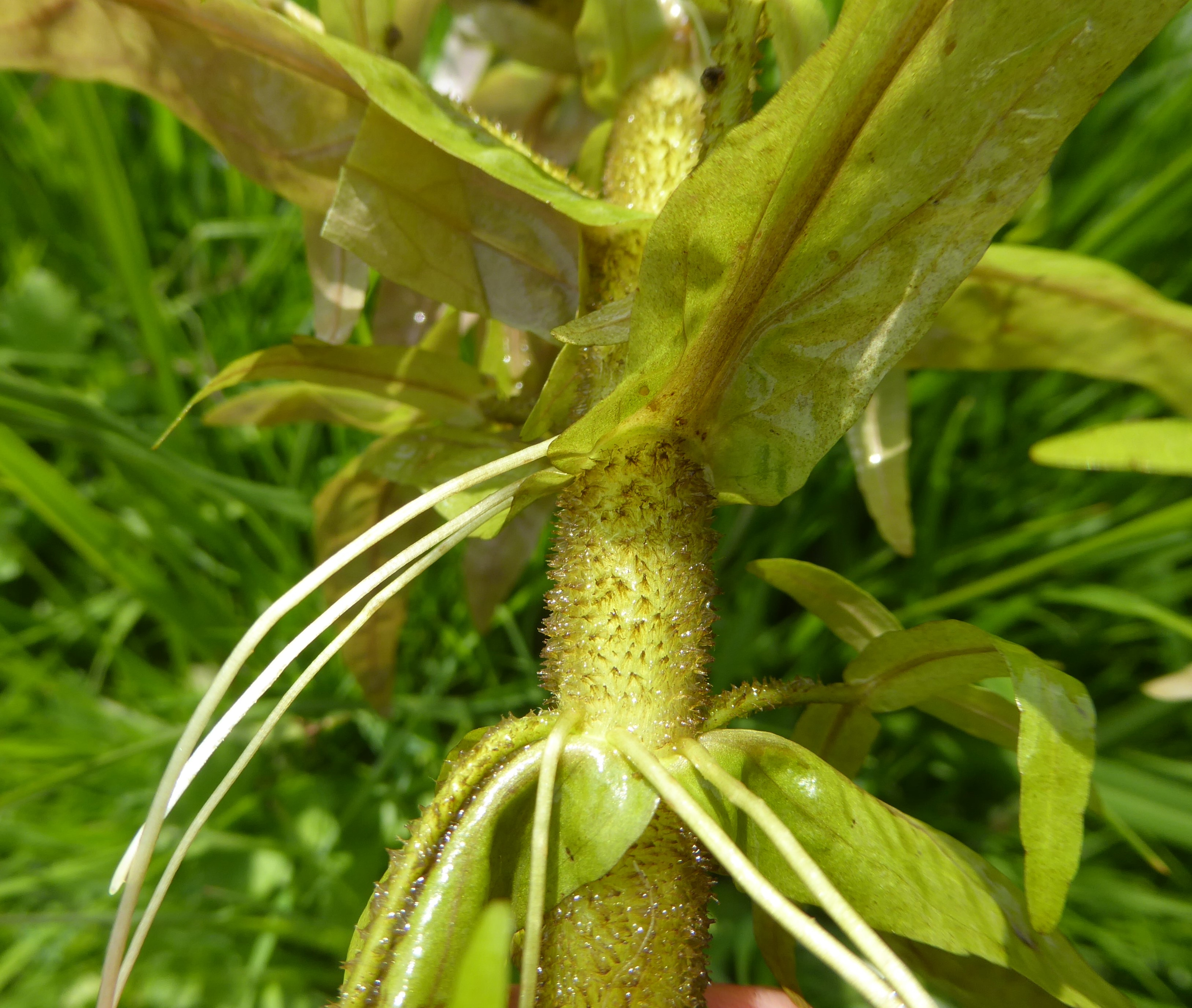
Aquatic stem, showing the characteristic coloration and root formation

The leaves are opposite and decussate (arranged alternately at right-angles), and semi-amplexicaul (clasping the stem at their bases). Leaves can vary greatly in size, from 1 to 15 cm (0.4 to 5.9 in) in length and 0.3–3 cm (0.1–1.2 in) in width. Aerial leaves are dark green above and paler beneath, and more-or-less lanceolate in shape, narrowing gradually from a wide base to a pointed tip. They are entire or slightly serrated towards the tip.

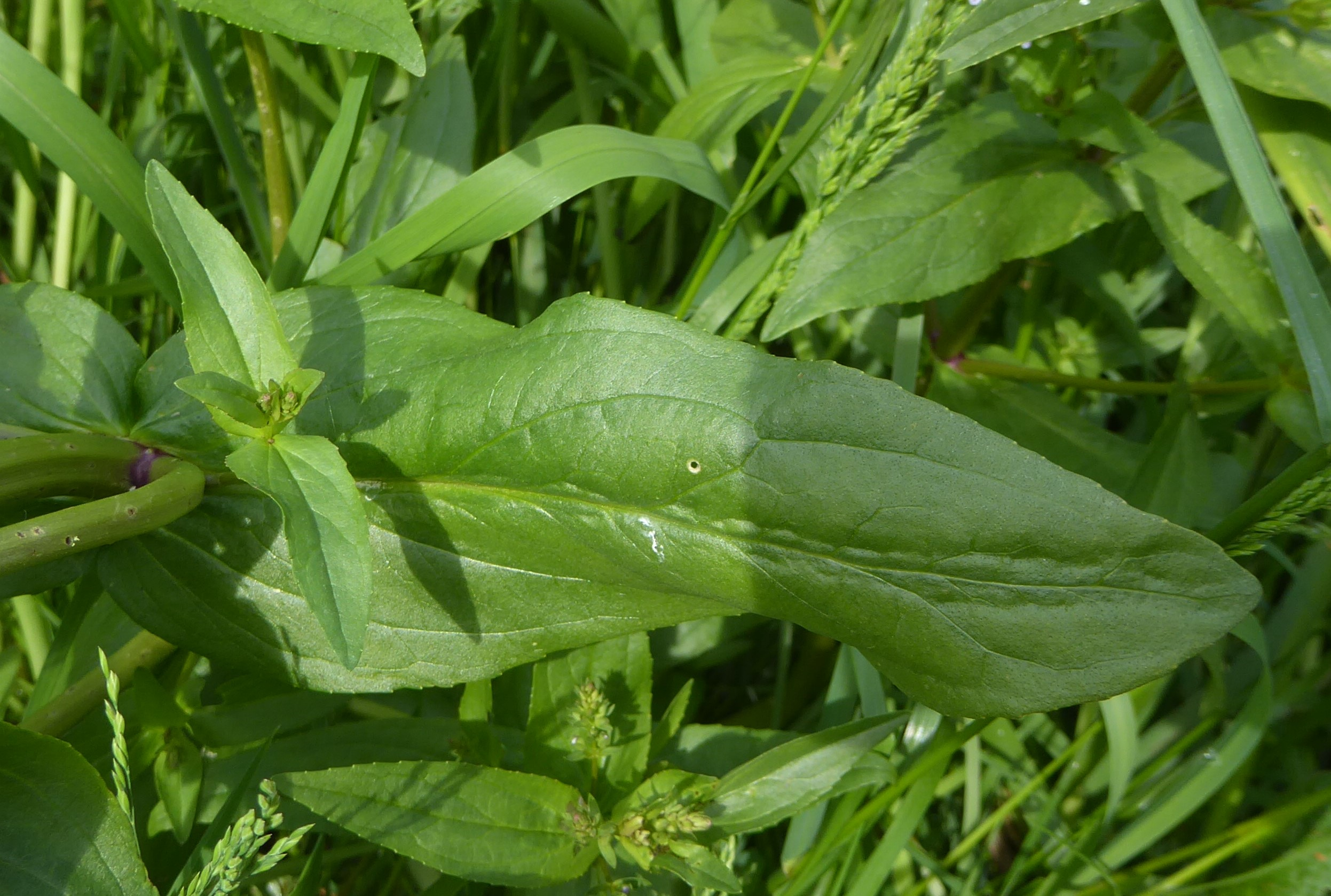
A leaf of pink water-speedwell, showing the indistinct serrations

The inflorescences arise from the leaf bases, usually in opposite pairs. Each one can have up to 50 flowers on short (5 mm) pedicels, which are typically shorter than the bracts that subtend them. The flowers are up to 10 mm in diameter, bisexual, with 4 pink corolla lobes (petals) with deeper pink lines, and 4 green calyx lobes (sepals). There are 2 stamens with blueish anthers and 1 style with a round stigma.

The fruits are heart-shaped capsules, 2–3 mm across, which open into 4 valves containing numerous pale brown seeds that are flat on one side, rounded on the other.

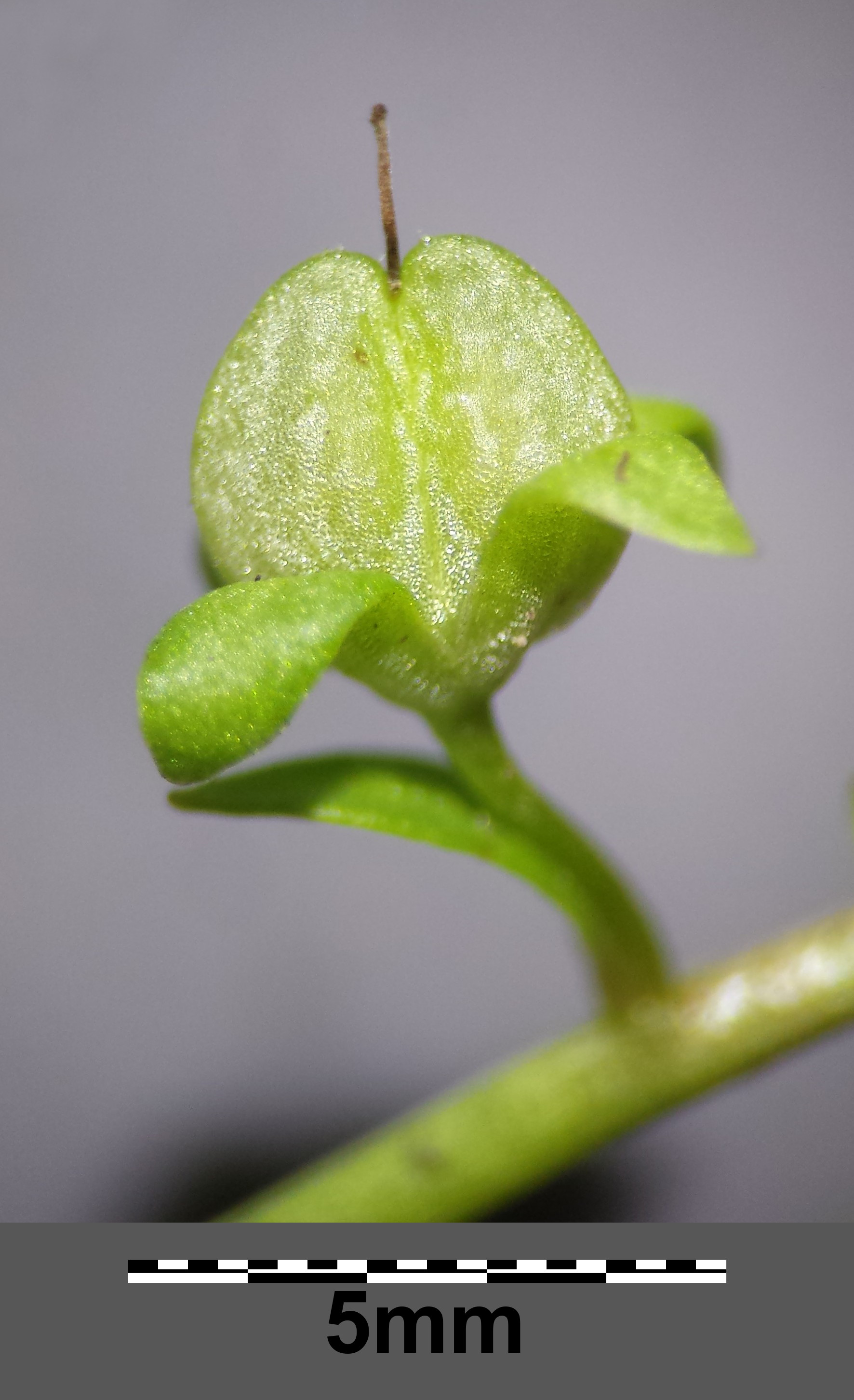
Immature seed capsule

Similar species include Veronica anagallis-aquatica (with purply-blue flowers), Veronica anagalloides (with elliptic fruits), Veronica × lackschewitzii (fruits fail to form, frequently very large plants) and also Veronica scardica and Veronica beccabunga.

== Subtaxa ==
The following subspecies are accepted:

- Veronica catenata subsp. catenata
- Veronica catenata subsp. pseudocatenata Chrtek & Osb.-Kos. – Libya, Egypt
