= Matachines =

Ritual dancers

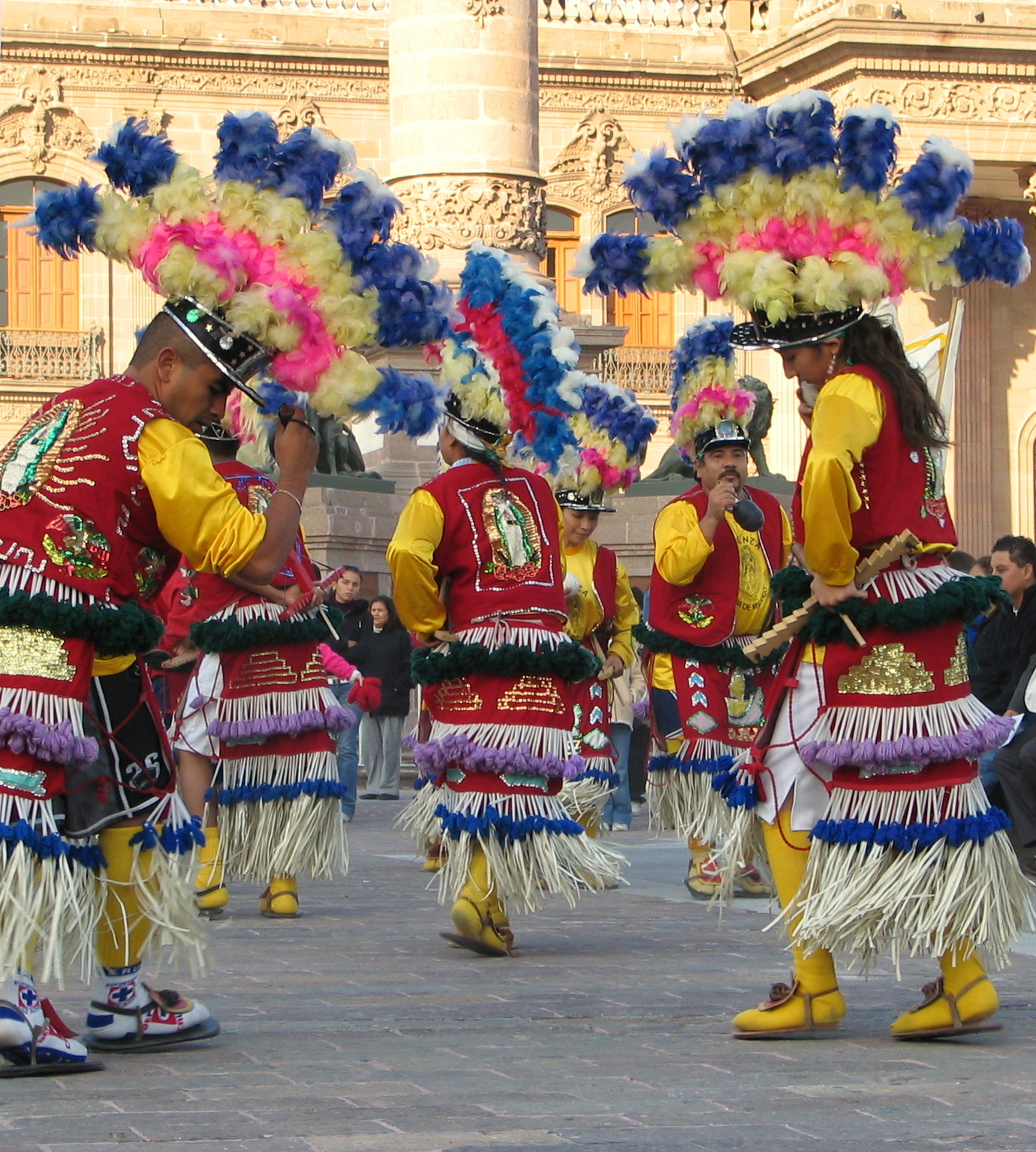
Procession of the Matachines in Monterrey, Mexico

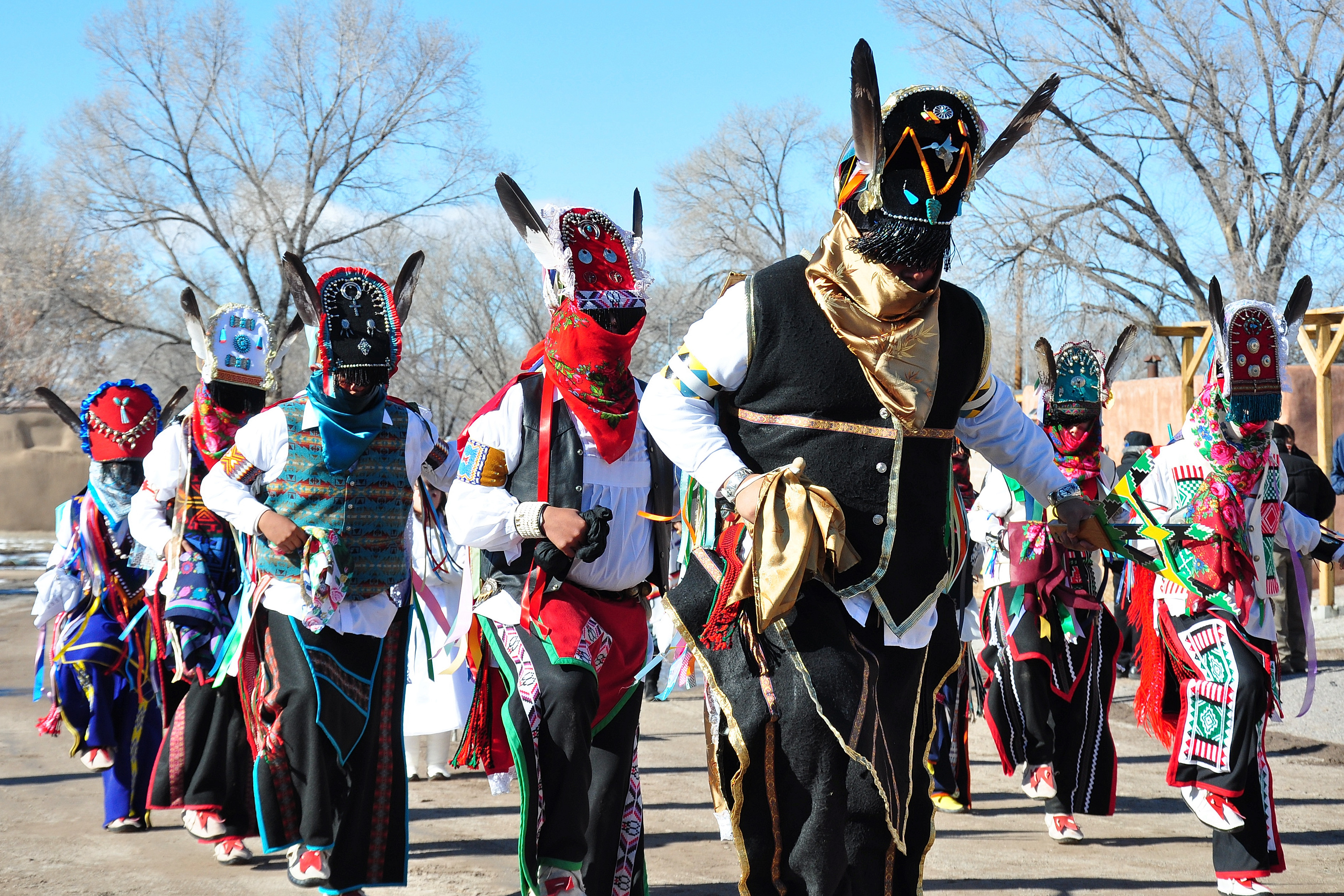
Matachines dancers in Ohkay Owingeh, New Mexico, 2012

Matachines (Spanish singular matachín; sword dancers dressed in ritual attire called bouffon) are a carnivalesque dancers performing a dance that emerged in Spain in the early 17th century, inspired by similar European traditions such as the moresca. The term danza de matachines refers to their characteristic dance and music. The dance was documented in the 1642 treatise Discursos sobre el arte del dançado by Juan de Esquivel Navarro. The tradition was imported into Latin American countries such as Mexico and Peru and into the Southwestern United States.

== Name ==
Matachines is also written as matlachines and matlatzines in central Mexico. The term matachines has been ascribed to Spanish, Italic, or Arabic origins.

== In the Americas ==
Currently, the matachines are societies of North and South American Native dancers who perform ritual dances. They are found from Peru up to northern New Mexico where the Spanish first influenced the New World and introduced Christianity. In Bernalillo, New Mexico, the Matachines de San Lorenzo have been performing for more than 300 years.

The Danza de Matachines is explained by oral history among most Pueblo tribes as the Dance of the Moors and Christians and is the first masked dance introduced by the Spaniards, though its practice outside of the Iberian peninsula changed its cultural and spiritual significance. The dance was adopted by the people, and today many forms of this dance still exist — though the dance steps vary among peoples, the dance formations are all similar. Masks continue to be used, but the style changes from village to village, or people to people. Its meaning is as a celebration of native peoples in the Americas and Philippines, and their salvation through the unity of their faith and culture.

The Matachines dance for a deeper religious purpose, since most of them join to venerate either Mother Mary (Our Lady of Guadalupe, Our Lady of Lourdes, Immaculate Conception, etc.), a saint (the group usually chooses the saint that pertains to the church they belong to), or simply to worship Christ or God the Holy Trinity, demonstrated by the three forked item symbolized as a "Sword of the Holy Trinity".

Dressed in traditional ceremonial dress and clothing, the chief characters are El Monarca (typically Moctezuma or other tribal leader), the captains (usually consist of 2-4 and are Moctezuma's main generals), La Malinche or Malintzín, the Native or Mestizo woman; and El Toro, the malevolent comic man of the play (also symbolizes Satan, or the Devil, according to Roman Catholic religious interpretations), dressed with the skins of the buffalo and wearing the horns of this sacred ancestor; Abuelo, the grandfather, and Abuela, grandmother. With the help of a chorus of dancers they portray the desertion of his people by Moctezuma, the luring of him back by the wiles and smiles of La Malinche, the final reunion of king and people and the killing of El Toro, who is supposed to have made all the mischief. Much symbolism is seen in these groups. The basic symbolism of the dance is good vs. evil, with good prevailing.

All of the cultural artifacts associated with the dance are blessed by a priest.

== Hampton Court, 1604 ==
A sword dance was performed at Hampton Court on 6 January 1604 by Scottish courtiers for Anne of Denmark in her presence chamber, before James VI and I, and the French ambassador, the Comte de Beaumont. Dudley Carleton wrote that the Scottish masquerade resembled a matachin and was "cleanly" performed.

== See also ==
- Moresca
