= Fridericia ulrikae =

Scientific classification
- Domain: Eukaryota
- Kingdom: Animalia
- Phylum: Annelida
- Clade: Pleistoannelida
- Clade: Sedentaria
- Class: Clitellata
- Order: Tubificida
- Family: Enchytraeidae
- Genus: Fridericia
- Species: F. ulrikae

Binomial name
- Fridericia ulrikae Rota & Healy, 1999

Species of annelid worm

Fridericia ulrikae is a species of annelid belonging to the family Enchytraeidae.

It is native to Northern Europe.
