= Strapwork =

Ornamentation motif

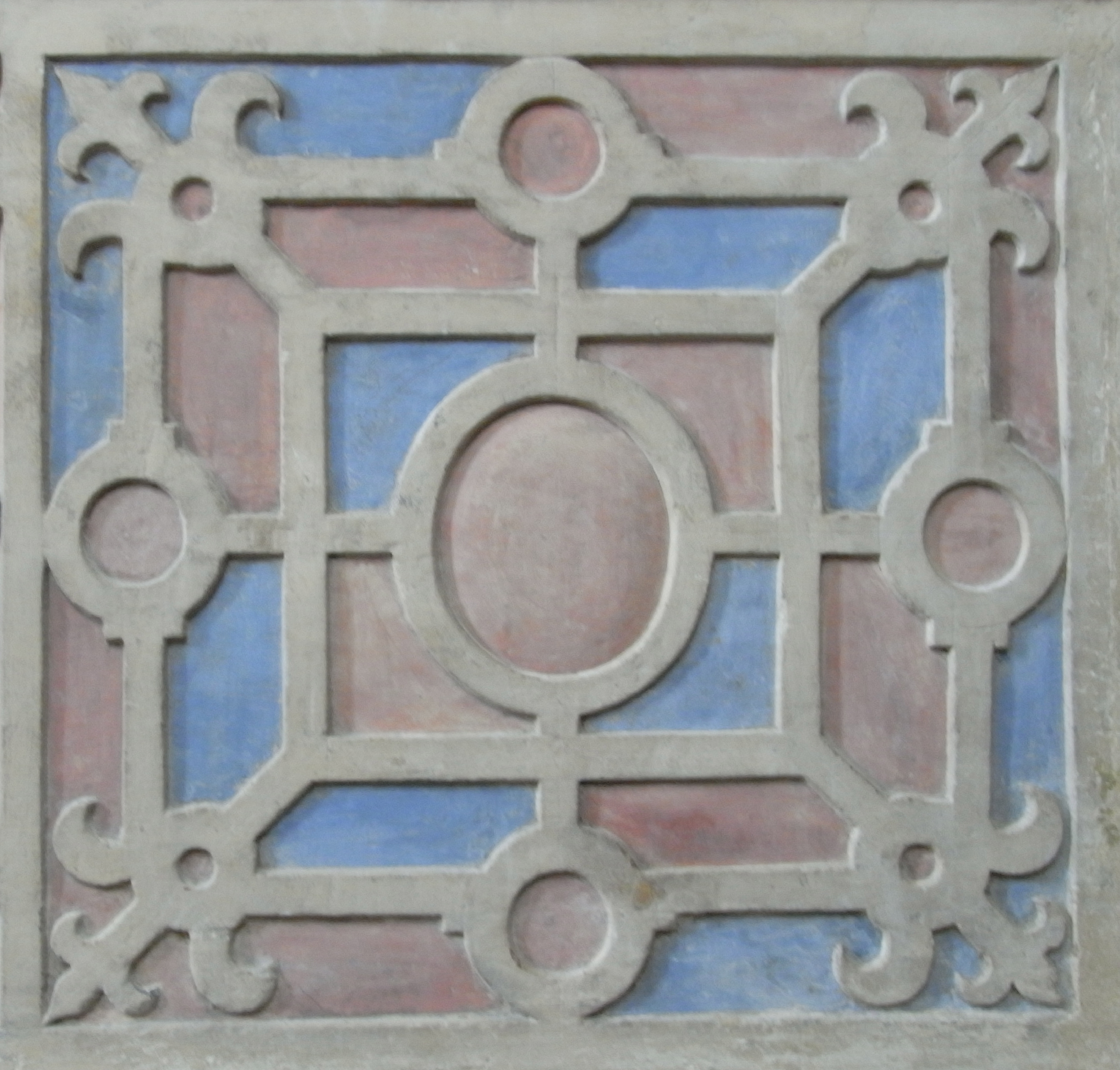
Typical early English strapwork of 1589, detail from the monument to Sir Gawen Carew in Exeter Cathedral

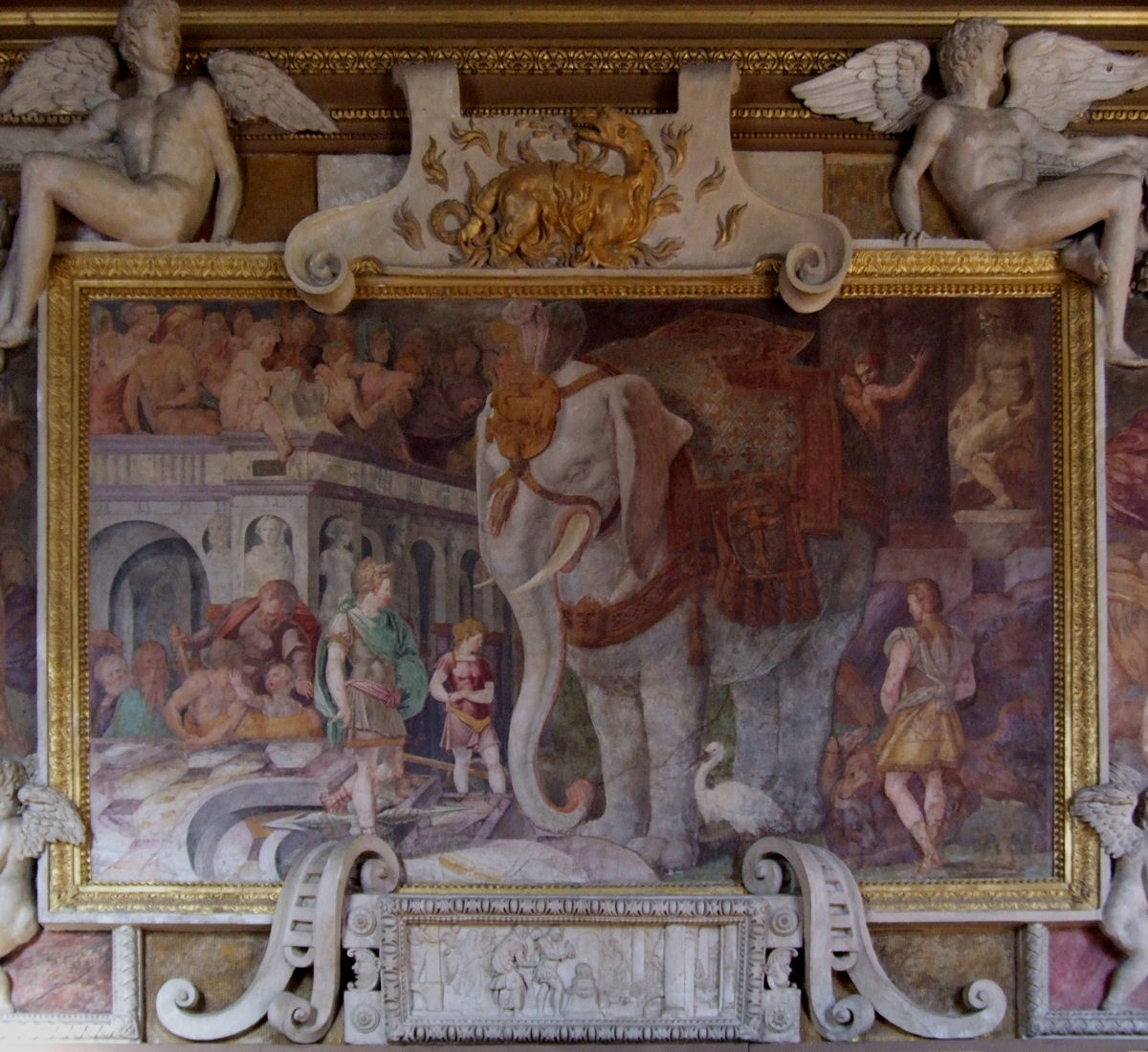
French stucco, scrollwork and strapwork by Rosso Fiorentino in the Palace of Fontainebleau, 1530s

In the history of art and design, strapwork is the use of stylised representations in ornament of ribbon-like forms. These may loosely imitate leather straps, parchment or metal cut into elaborate shapes, with piercings, and often interwoven in a geometric pattern. In early examples there may or may not be three-dimensionality, either actual in curling relief ends of the elements, or just represented in two dimensions. As the style continued, these curling elements became more prominent, often turning into scrollwork, where the ends curl into spirals or scrolls. By the Baroque scrollwork was a common element in ornament, often partly submerged by other rich ornament.

European strapwork is a frequent background and framework for grotesque ornament – arabesque or candelabra figures filled with fantastical creatures, garlands and other elements – which were a frequent decorative motif in 16th-century Northern Mannerism, and revived in the 19th century and which may appear on walls – painted, in frescos, carved in wood, or moulded in plaster or stucco – or in graphic work. The Europeanized arabesque patterns called moresque are also very often combined with strapwork, especially in tooled and gilded bookbindings.

Scrollwork is a variant that tended to replace strapwork almost completely by the Baroque. It is less geometric and more organic, more three dimensional, and with emphasis on the curling ends of the "straps". The Italian artists at the Palace of Fontainebleau had already moved onto this by the 1530s, but in provincial work in northern Europe flat strapwork panels continued for another century or more.

Where there is no suggestion of three dimensions – curling ends and the like – the decoration may also be called bandwork or "interlaced bands", the more technically correct term. Peter Fuhring derives this style from Islamic ornament.

== Italy ==
Strapwork designs, influenced by Islamic ornament, are found on tooled book-covers in Italy and Spain by the mid-15th century, and in other media by the early 16th century, for example in the Raphael Loggie in the Vatican. By the time the First School of Fontainebleau had spread their very emphatic version of the style to northern Europe, the Italians had largely abandoned it, although it remained common on fine decorated bookbindings in Italy as elsewhere, often combined with moresque decoration.

== Flemish ==
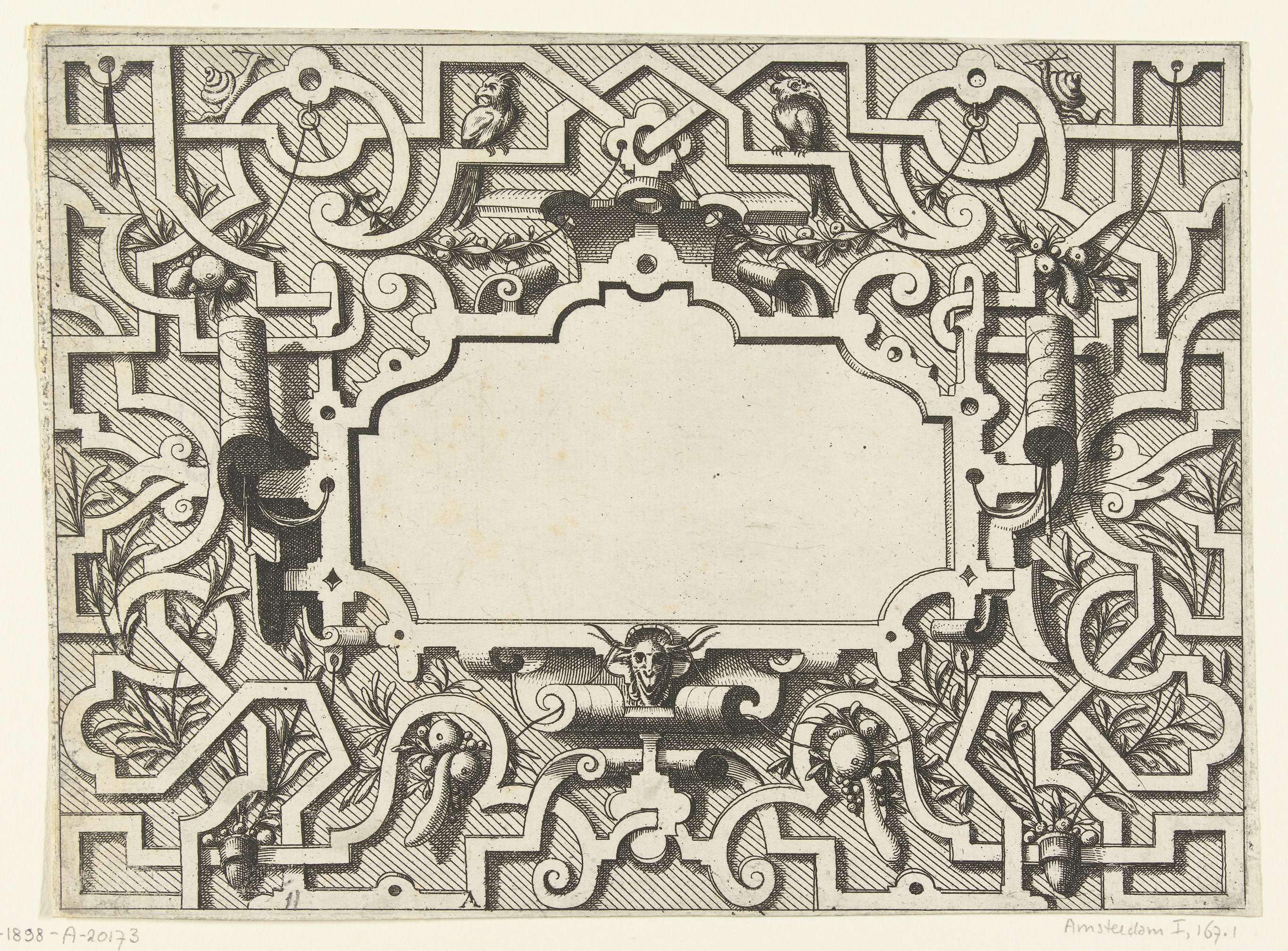
Ornament print, 1550s, Hans Vredeman de Vries

The forms developed in Antwerp by Cornelis Floris, Cornelis Bos, Hans Vredeman de Vries and others were disseminated by ornament prints from about 1550 and had an enormous influence across northern Europe. Floris "developed the massive Fontainebleau strapwork into a yet more nightmarish style of his own", but also, with Bos, "experimented with an altogether lighter, more elegant variety".

== France ==
Strapwork was found earlier, but really came to prominence after it was used in stucco in the enormous elaborate decorative frames designed by Rosso Fiorentino and his team for the Palace of Fontainebleau in the 1530s. Thereafter, spread by prints, it became part of the vocabulary of Northern Mannerist ornament.

== England ==
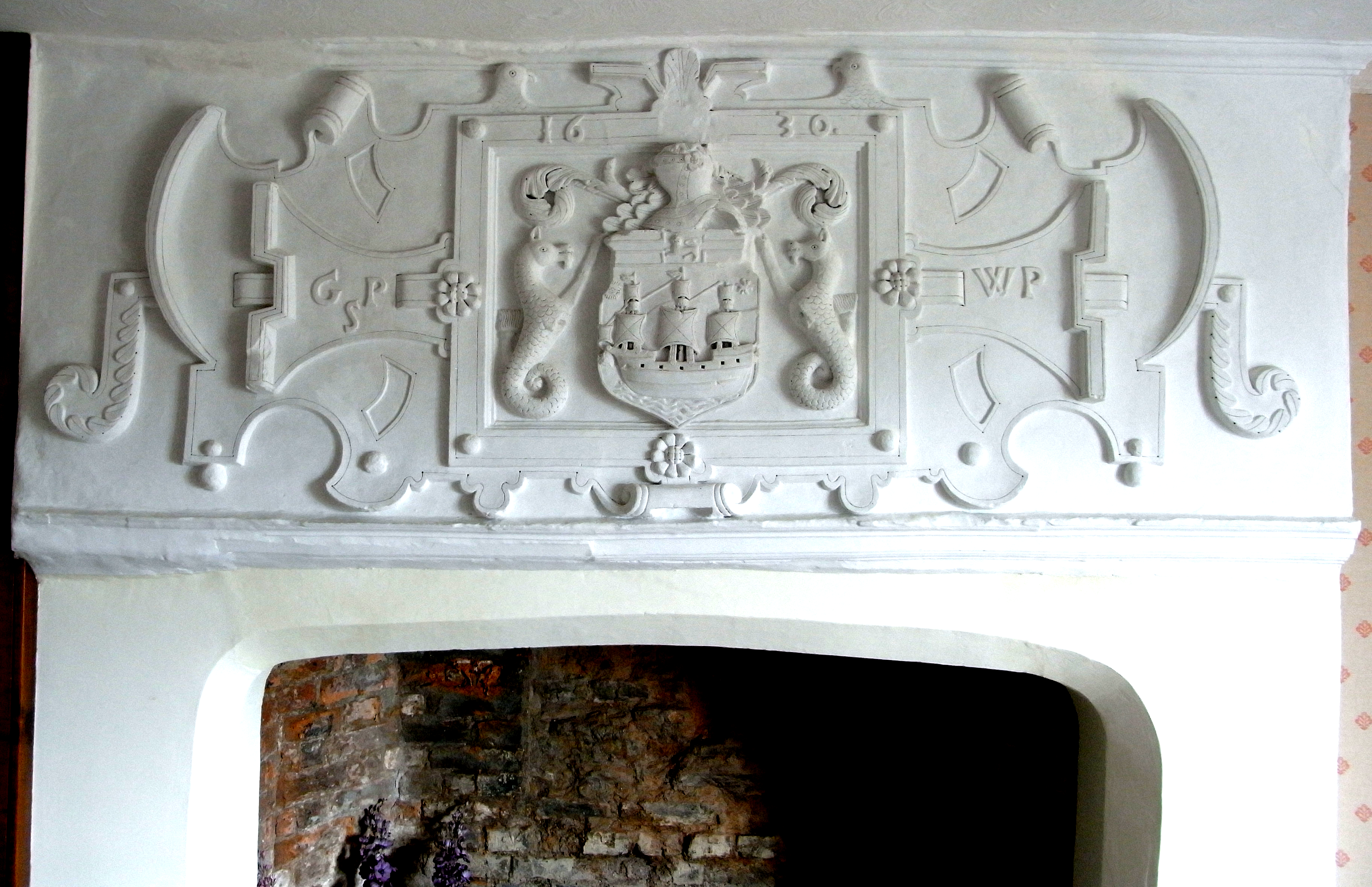
Overmantel of 1630, Fremington, Devon

Strapwork became popular in England in the late 16th and 17th centuries as a form of plasterwork decorative moulding used particularly on ceilings, but also sculpted in stone for example around entrance doors, as at Misarden Park (1620), Gloucestershire, or on monumental sculpture, as on the frieze of the monument to Sir John Newton (d.1568), at East Harptree, Gloucestershire, and on that of Sir Gawen Carew (d.1575) in Exeter Cathedral. Wollaton Hall outside Nottingham makes especially extensive, and for some excessive, use of strapwork inside and out.

== Islamic ==
Islamic girih uses complex patterns and interlace, but the form of the strips is generally simple, does not vary along their length, and no attempt to achieve a stylized impression of other materials is made. The patterns it used influenced European ornament in the Renaissance, through the Moresque style.

Girih is an Islamic decorative art form used in architecture and handicrafts (book covers, tapestry, small metal objects) from the 8th century onwards. It consists of geometric lines that form an interlaced strapwork. Girih patterns are used in varied media including tilework, brickwork, stucco, wood (for example in minbar pulpits) and mosaic faience work.

== Gallery ==
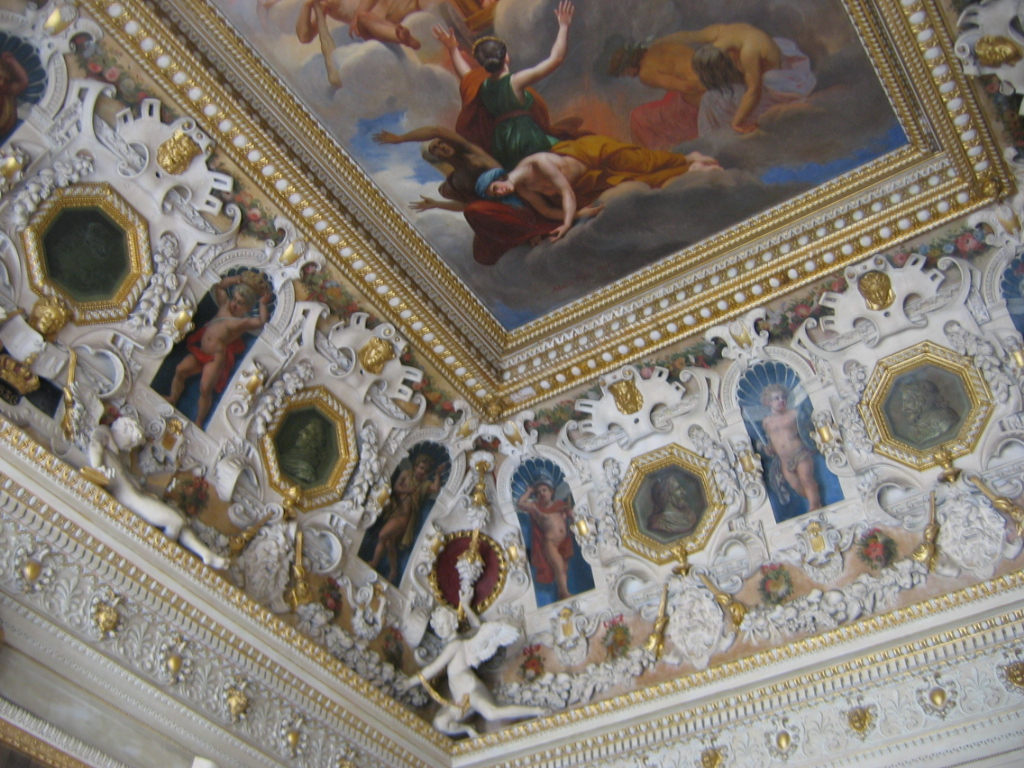
Sophisticated three-dimensional strapwork in stucco at the Palace of Fontainebleau

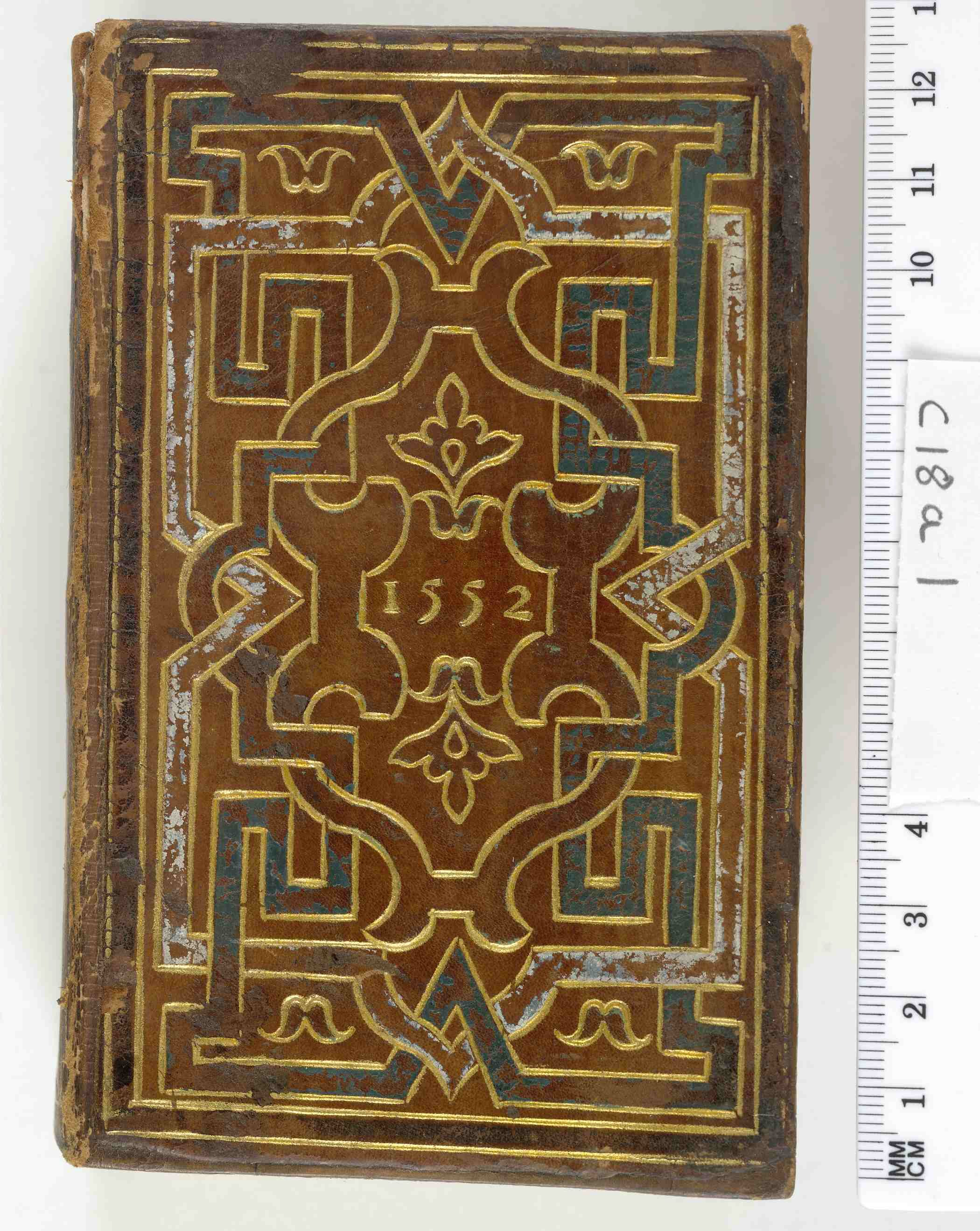
French bookbinding, 1552

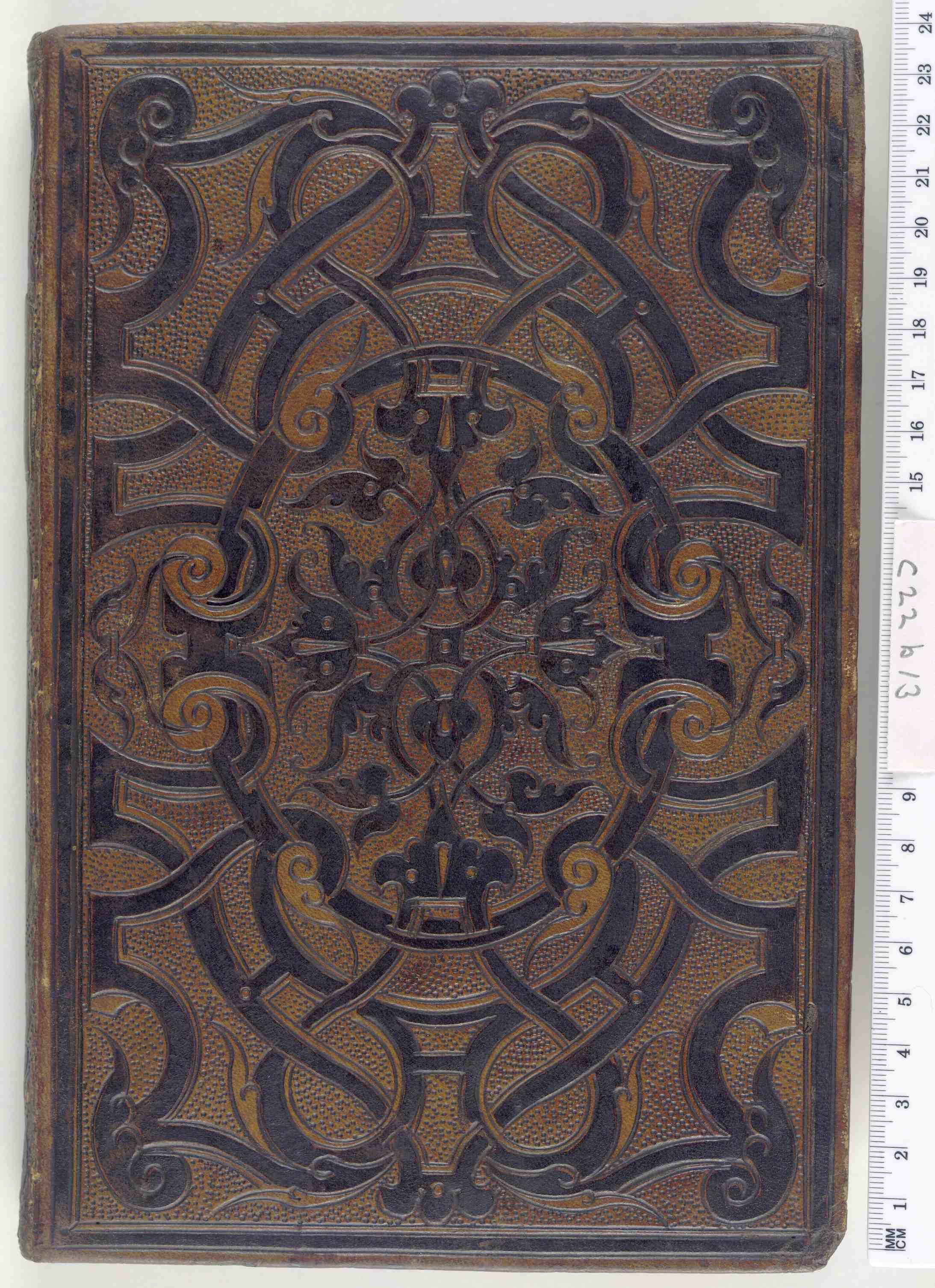
French bookbinding, 1555 or after

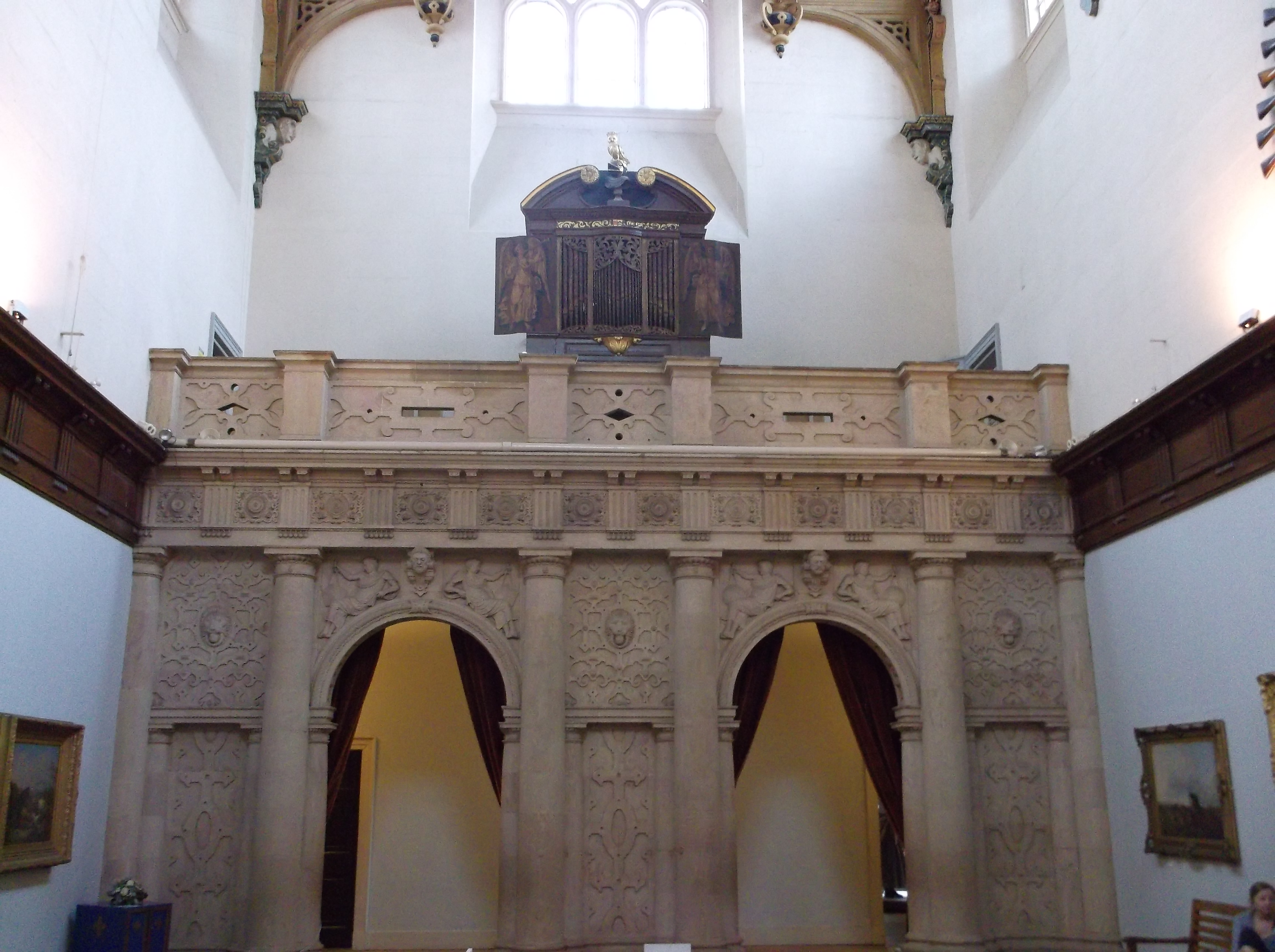
The stone screen in the hall at Wollaton Hall outside Nottingham

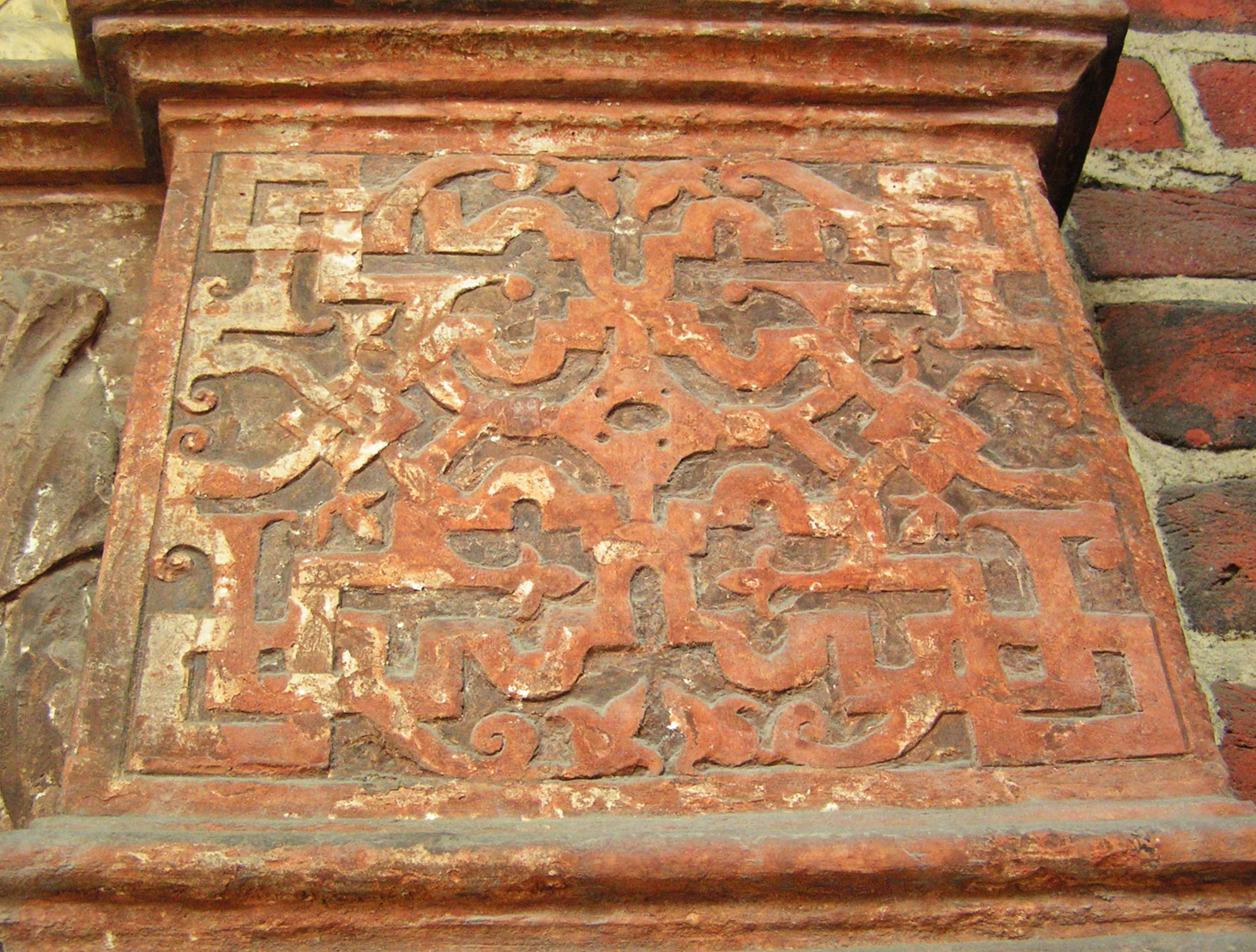
Polish strapwork c. 1566, detail from Czarny mural monument, Church of St. Mary, Kraków

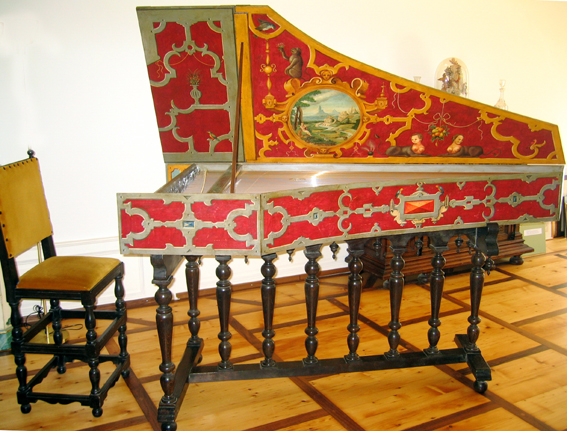
Modern reproduction harpsichord uses bandwork or strapwork motifs based on a Flemish book of 1579, mixed in with grotesque elements.

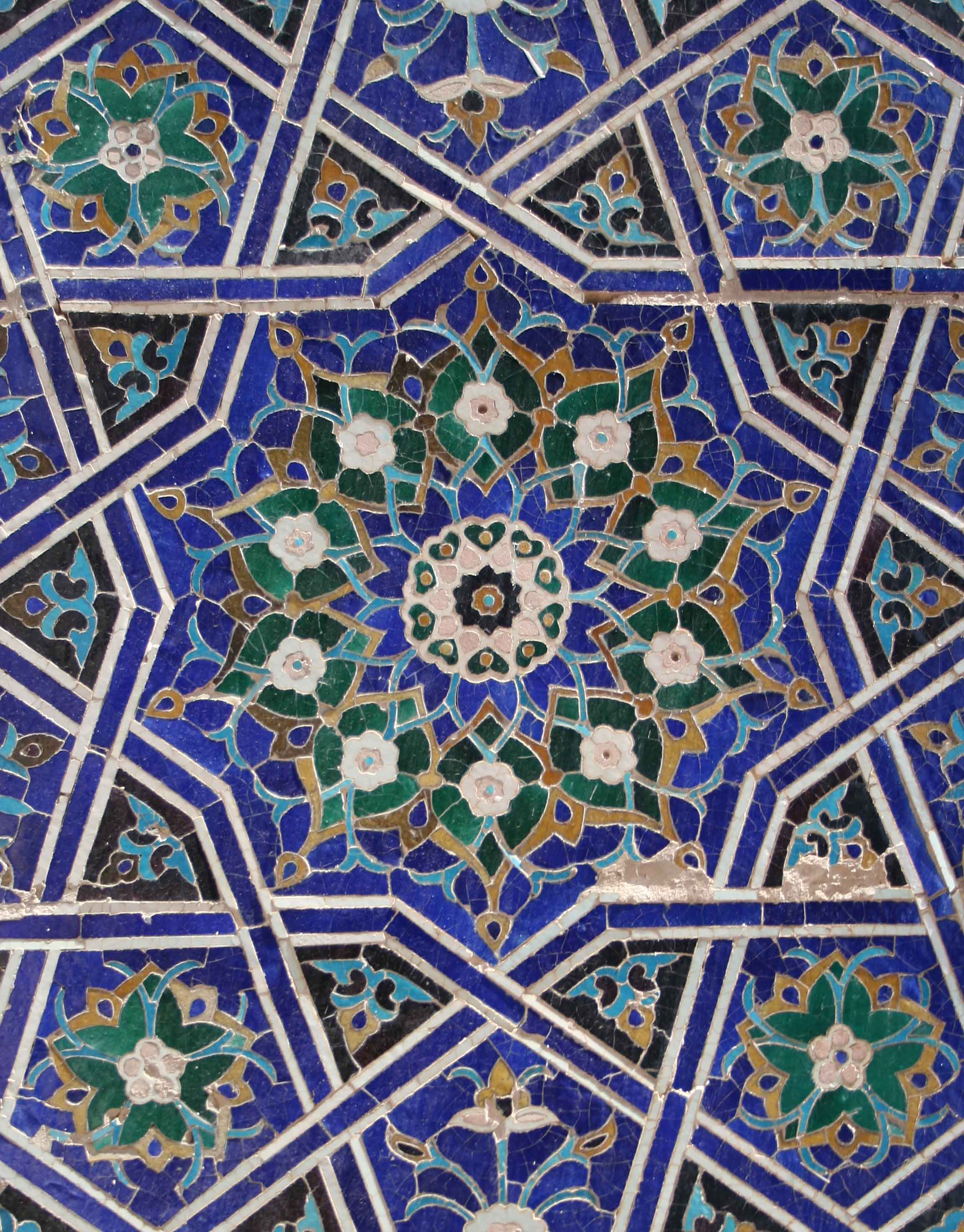
Girih, Islamic geometric patterns with inlaid floral decoration, Samarkhand
