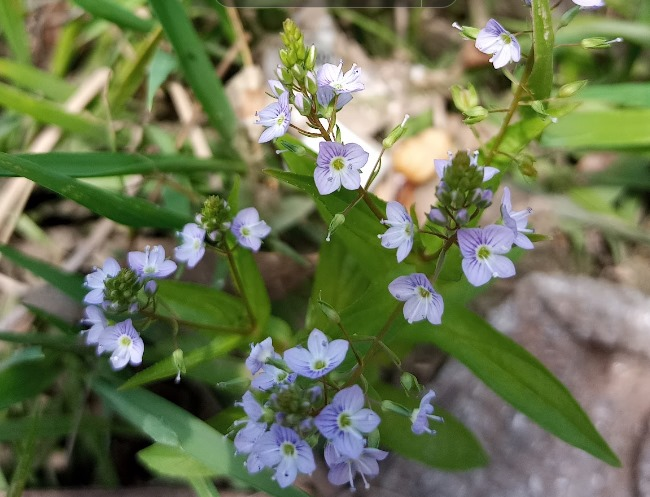

Conservation status
- Least Concern (IUCN 3.1)

Scientific classification
- Kingdom: Plantae
- Clade: Tracheophytes
- Clade: Angiosperms
- Clade: Eudicots
- Clade: Asterids
- Order: Lamiales
- Family: Plantaginaceae
- Genus: Veronica
- Species: V. anagallis-aquatica

Binomial name
- Veronica anagallis-aquatica L.

Synonyms
- Beccabunga anagallis-aquatica; Veronica palustris

= Veronica anagallis-aquatica =

Plant species in the veronica family

Veronica anagallis-aquatica is a species of flowering plant in the family Plantaginaceae known by the common names water speedwell, blue water-speedwell, and brook pimpernel.

== Description ==
An upright, short-lived perennial flower of medium height (50 cm or 20 in) or sometimes tall (1 m or 3 ft 3 in), with spikes of many (20-40(60)) pale violet-bluish flowers (5–10 mm diam) with darker veins of the same colour, having four lobes that resemble petals. These flower spikes arise from the stem where leaves emerge. The leaves are opposite, rather elongated and pointed at the tip, clasping the stem, and serrate-toothed in the end half, except for the lowermost that are often stalked and lacking in teeth. Aside from reproducing by seeds, the plant sends out rooting branches that spread it vegetatively early in its growth, whilst its main stems curve along the ground rooting before rising upwards to flower, and in floods pieces will break off and root further downstream.

=== Identification characteristics ===
Important identification characteristics of V. anagallis-aquatica are: flower colour (purply-blue), bracts (usually much shorter than the flower stalk, and narrow), fruit (somewhat elongated), sepals (not spreading wide open on fruiting), fruiting stalks (base not spreading at a very wide angle) and leaves (somewhat broadish, and lowest stalked).

Similar plants include:

- V. catenata flowers are white or pale pink with rosy pink veins, bracts reaching the flowers, fruits broader than long, sepals spread wide open at fruiting, fruiting stalk bases forming a large angle to the stem (c. 90 deg), leaves somewhat narrow-looking and the lowest leaves unstalked.
- V. x lackschewitzii has almost no fruits forming, and the plant is usually noticeably large and robust with large floral spikes.

== Distribution ==
It is native throughout the old world from southern Africa to Eurasia, and is introduced elsewhere. It occurs in many types of moist and wet habitat, and it is semi-aquatic, often growing in shallow water along streambanks, in ponds, and in other wetland environments.

== Conservation status in the United States ==
It is listed as threatened in Indiana, and as endangered in Massachusetts, New Jersey, and Tennessee.
