= Morianbron =

Coordinates: 59°23′21″N 18°00′56″E

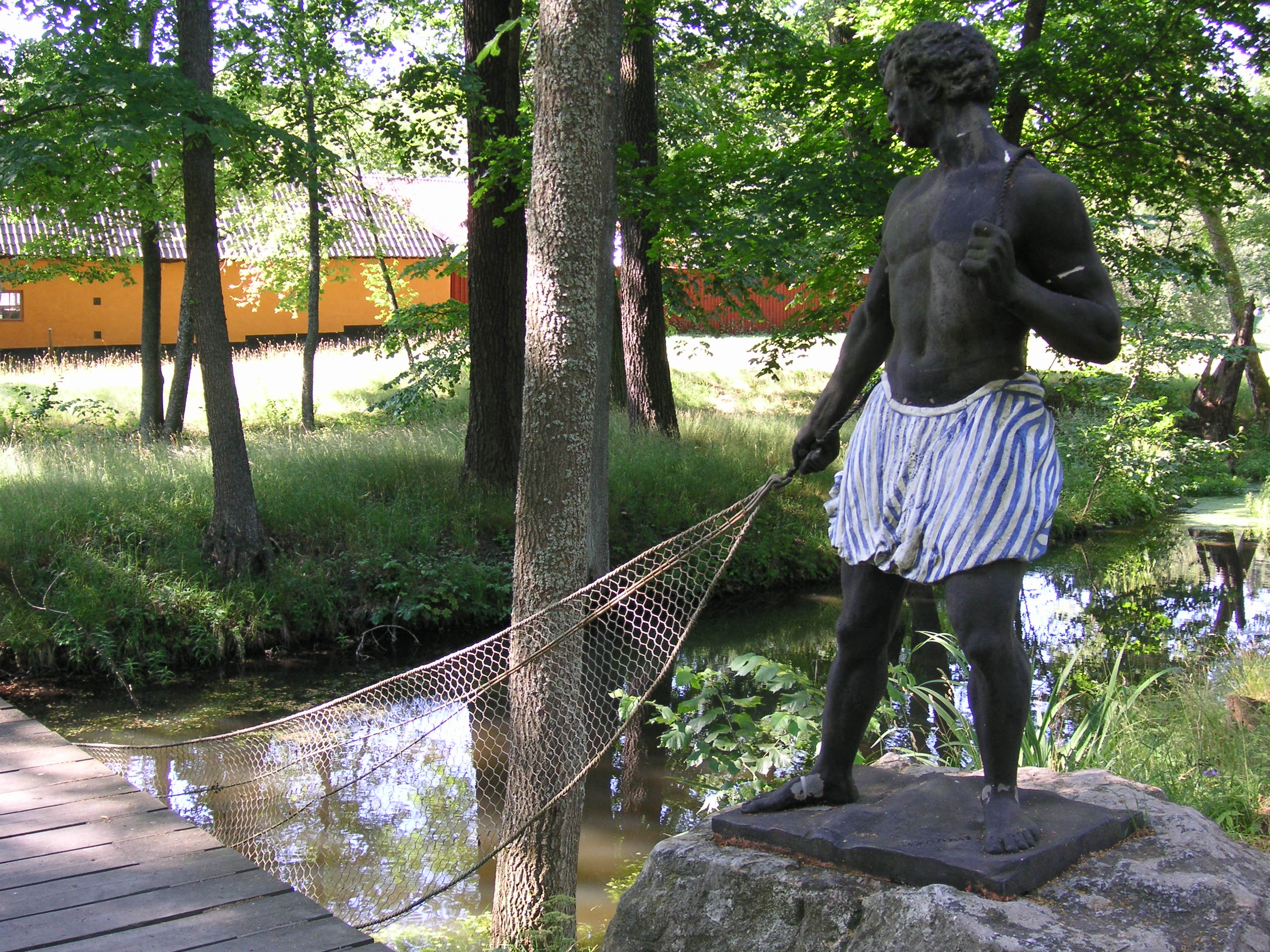
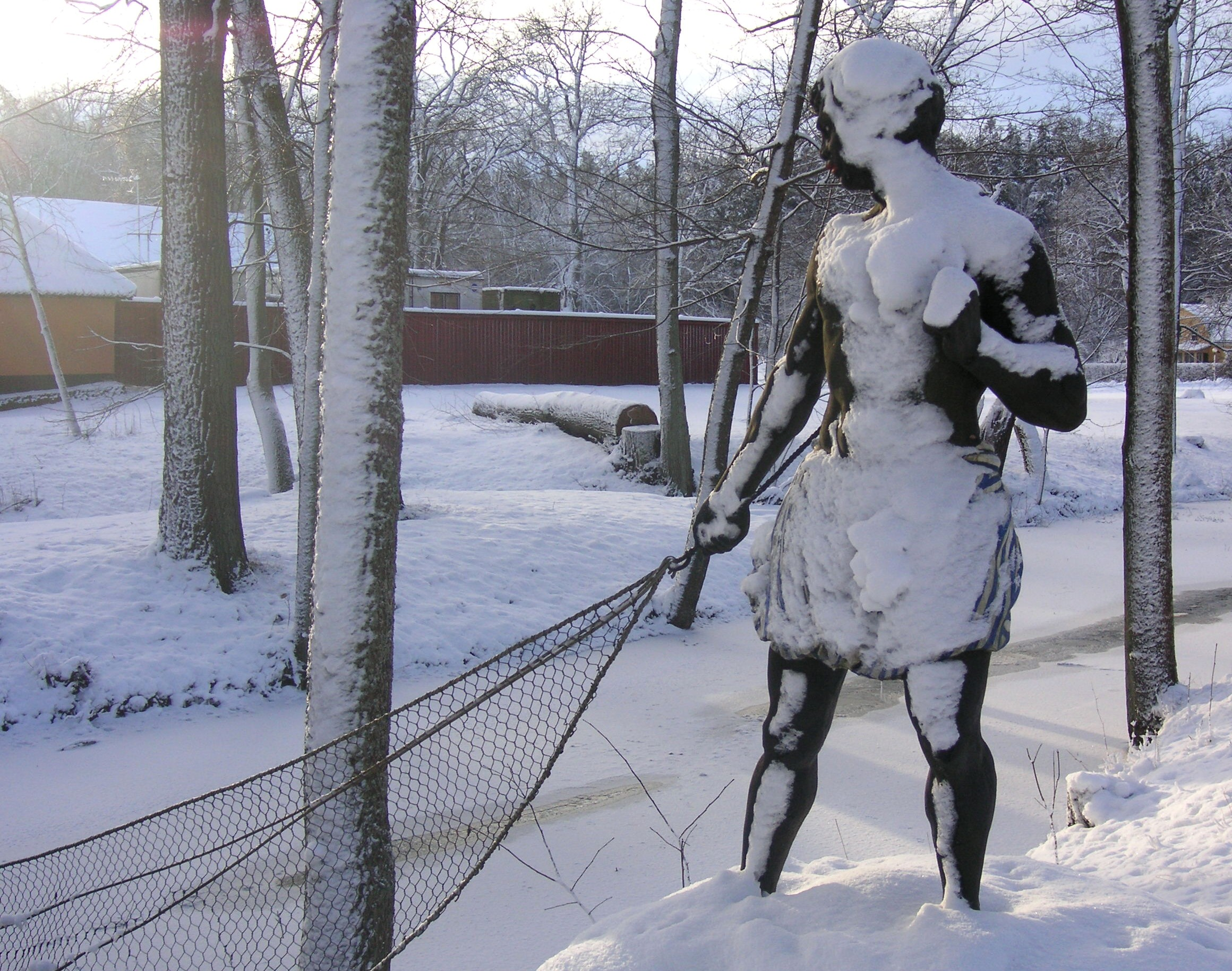
One of the two Blackamoors in summer and in winter.

Morianbron (Swedish: Blackamoor Bridge) is a small bridge in the gardens of the Ulriksdal Palace in Solna, Sweden, named after the pair of sculptures of so-called blackamoors (e.g. black Moors) standing by the bridge.

Arguably the smallest bridge in the Swedish capital, it also passes over the indeed small stream Igelbäcken flowing through the gardens. The low wooden bridge is on either side flanked by two bronze sculptures painted in black of two black men dressed in loinclothes pulling a fishing net passing under the bridge. The two sculptures, moulded in the early 19th century by the sculptor Per Lundgren, were brought to the Ulriksdal Palace from the royal gardens at Hagaparken. There, they were standing by the network of canals that once flew through the park.

According to an amusing story, a lady standing on the bridge fell in love with the two men and, not being able to choose between them, threw herself into the stream to end her pang of love. The anecdote not only suits the romantic and picturesque environment, it also reflects the fancy for exotic people prevalent during the 18th and early 19th century, typically represented by artists such as Eugène Delacroix.

== See also ==
- List of bridges in Stockholm
