= Mohr im Hemd =

Austrian dessert

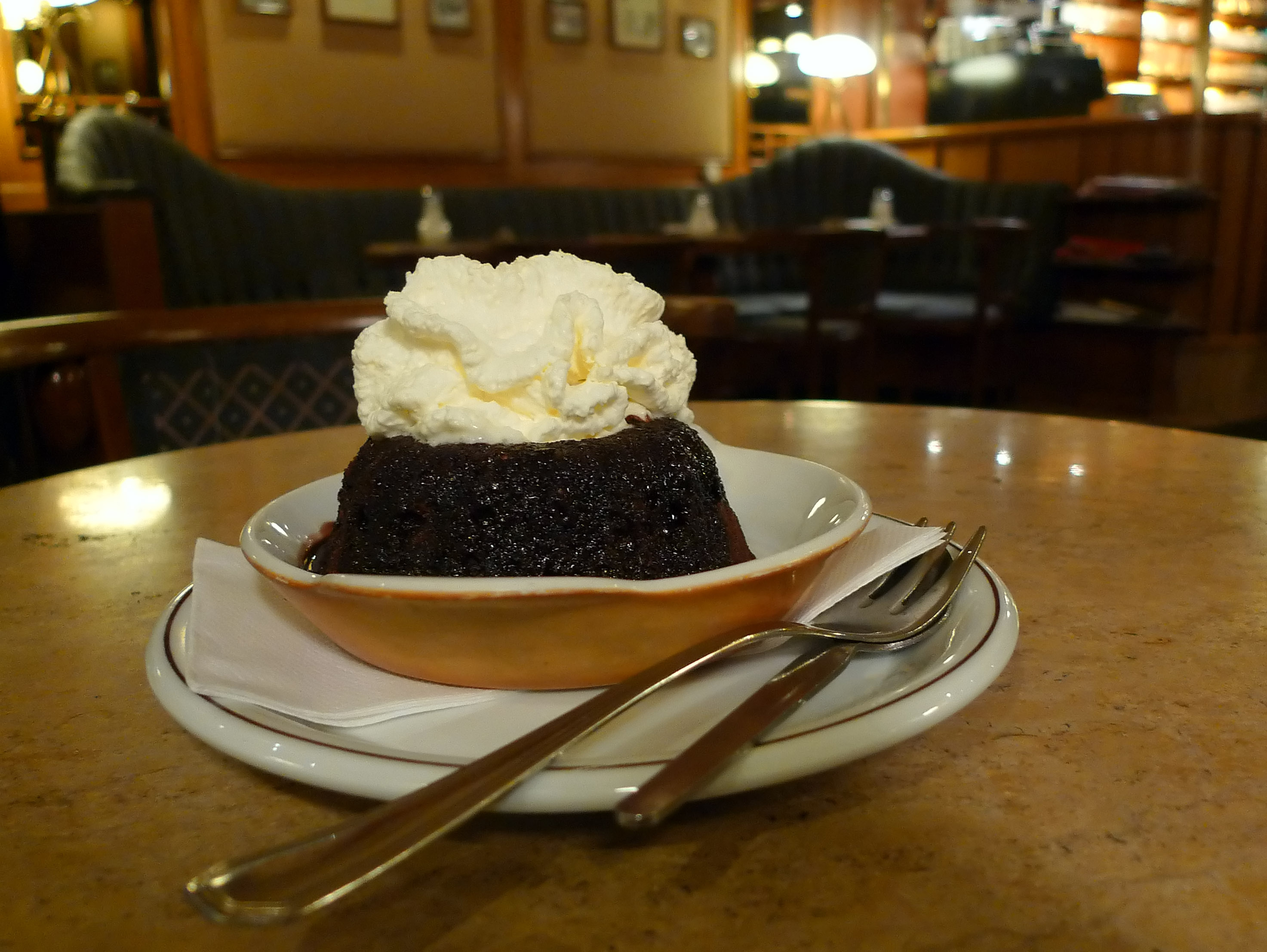
Mohr im Hemd, served in a Viennese coffee house

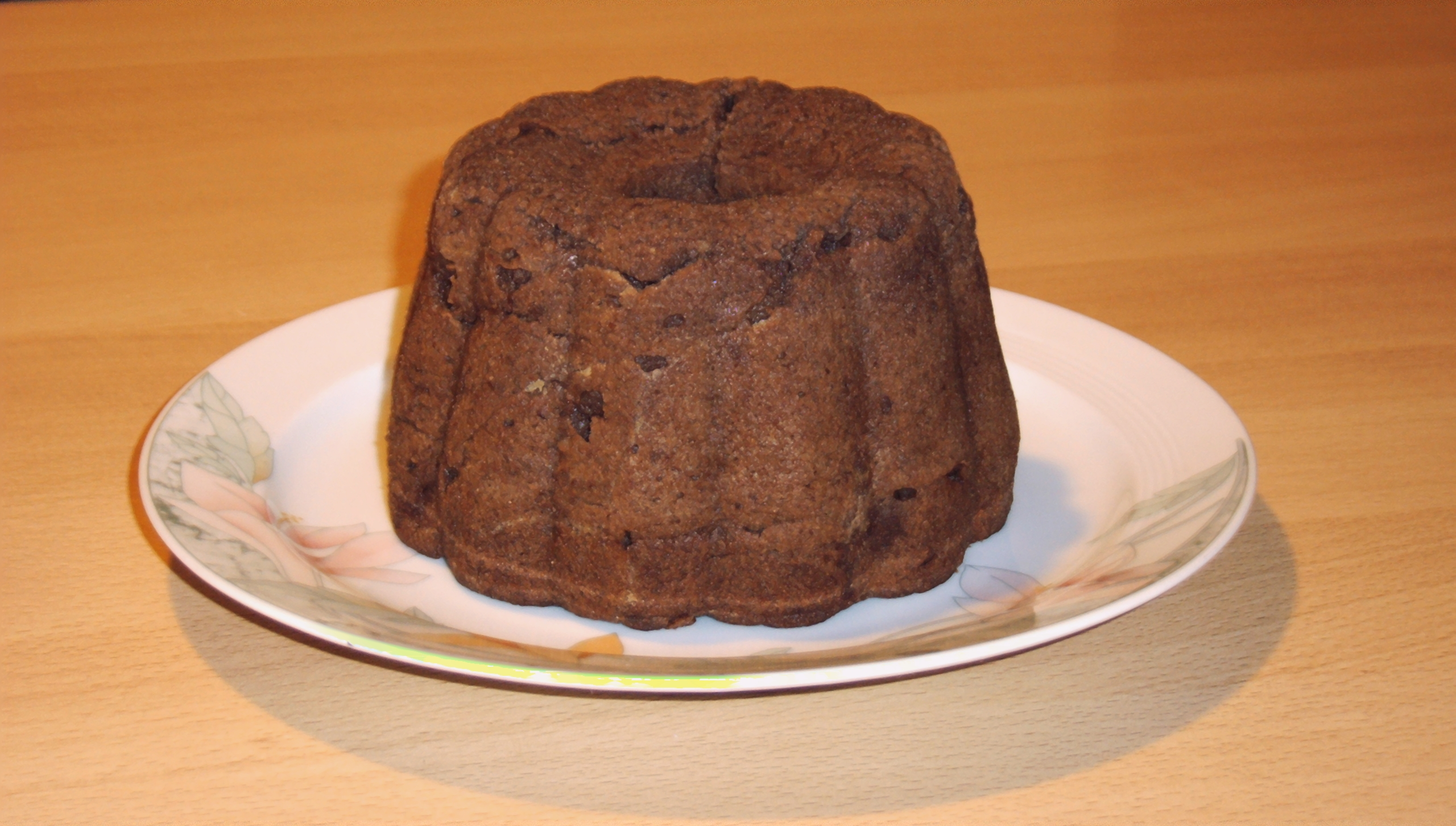
Bare, without sauce or cream

Mohr im Hemd (German: [moːɐ̯ ɪm hɛmt], literally "Moor in [a] shirt") is an Austrian dessert. It consists of a chocolate pudding topped with whipped cream, hence the name.

In modern times, the dish is often prepared with breadcrumbs to form a solid mass, resembling a lava cake or miniature gugelhupf, and served with chocolate sauce and whipped cream. Older recipes more closely resemble a chocolate custard, with the primary ingredients being chocolate and eggs.

The racial connotations of the dish's name have drawn controversy. In 2012, the human rights organization SOS Mitmensch publicly criticized the name, suggesting replacements such as Kuchen mit Schlag (literally "cake with whipped cream").

Since 2012, the dictionary Duden has described the word "Mohr" as often being seen as discriminatory, and since 2019 as "obsolete, today discriminatory" (veraltet, heute diskriminierend).
