= Parador de Úbeda =

Hotel in Spain

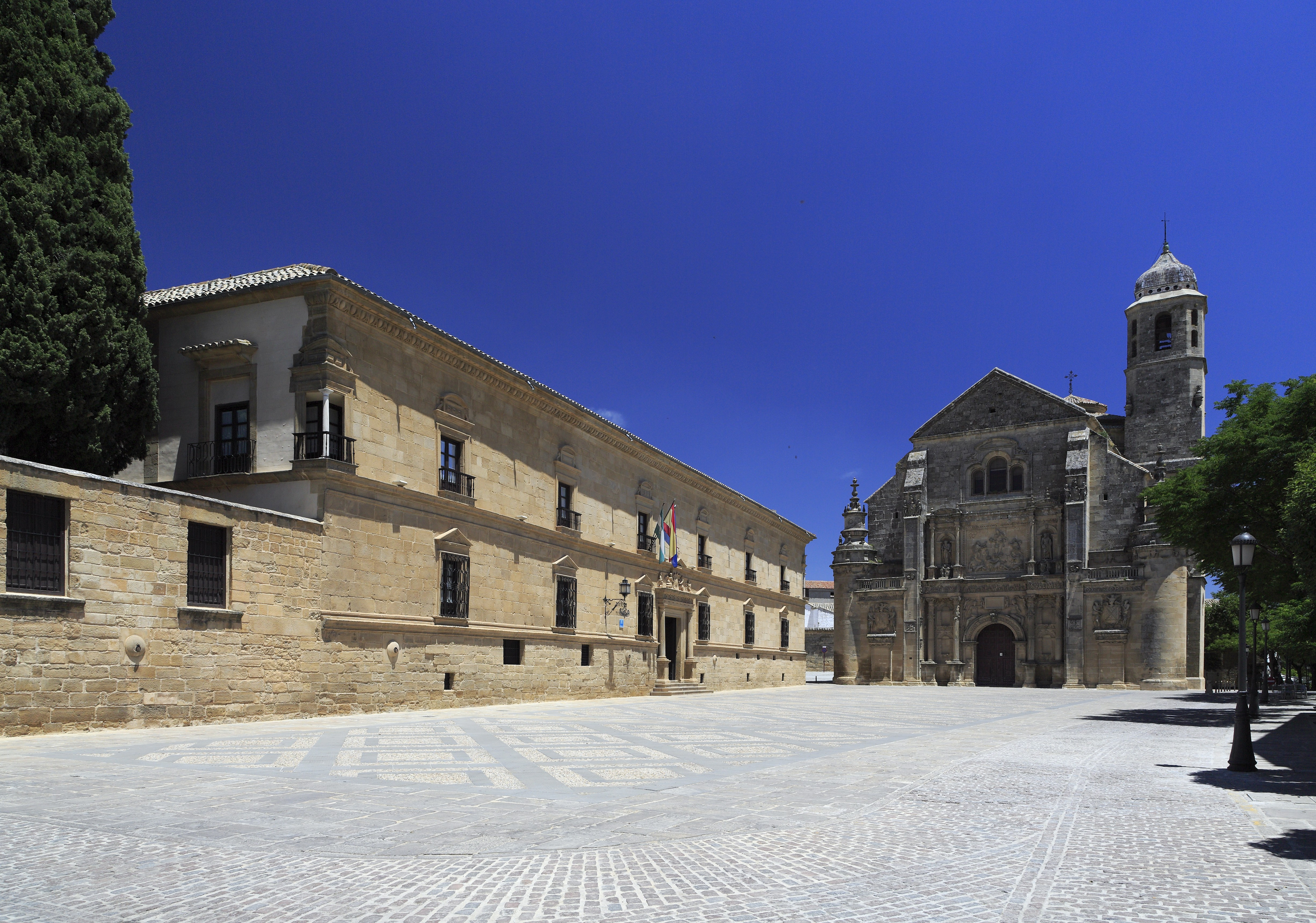
- Parador de Úbeda seen on the left
- Interactive map of the Parador de Úbeda area
- Former names: El Palacio del Deán Ortega; El Palacio del Marqués del Donadío
- Alternative names: El Parador del Condestable Dávalos
- Hotel chain: Paradores

General information
- Type: Palace converted to hotel
- Architectural style: Renacimiento español (Spanish Renaissance)
- Location: Plaza de Vázquez de Molina, Úbeda, province of Jaén,, Spain
- Year built: c.1545—c.1575
- Inaugurated: 10 November 1930

Design and construction
- Architect: Andrés de Vandelvira

Renovating team
- Architects: Ricardo de Churruca; José María Muguruza Otaño; Eduardo Amann Sánchez; Manuel Sainz de Vicuña

Website
- Parador de Úbeda

The Parador de Úbeda, also known as the Palacio del Deán Ortega, the Palacio del Marqués del Donadío and the Parador del Condestable Dávalos is a four-star Parador hotel located in the oldest part of the city of Úbeda, in the province of Jaén, in the eastern part of the autonomous community of Andalucía, Spain.
It is situated in the monumental Plaza de Vázquez de Molina, and surrounded by other imposing Renaissance buildings. Its original building, the Palacio del Deán Ortega, converted into a hotel in 1930, is one of the most important Renacimiento español (Spanish Renaissance) palaces in the city.

Originally built in the sixteenth century for the dean of the cathedral of Málaga and head chaplain of the Holy Chapel of El Salvador of Úbeda, it served as a private home for 350 years. In 1929 it passed into the ownership of the Spanish state who, while preserving its historic elements, converted it into one of the first of the state-run hotels known as Paradores and gave it the name Condestable Dávalos. Among the 17 Paradores in Andalucía, it is one of five to be converted from an historical building rather than erected as a contemporary building or as a modern historical pastiche. With the increase of tourism to Spain in the 1960s it underwent a limited expansion. A number of later attempts to expand into nearby properties were abandoned, leaving the Parador similar in size and appearance to its original 1930 conversion, with a capacity for 72 guests.

== The original building and its history ==
The original building of the Parador de Úbeda was a palace built in the early and mid-sixteenth century for Hernando Ortega y Salido (c.1490—1571), dean of the cathedral of Málaga and head chaplain of the Holy Chapel of El Salvador of Úbeda, the church next door to the Parador. He wished to have a private residence close to the building of which he was in charge. The palace is believed to have been designed by the architect Andrés de Vandelvira (1509—1575), one of the important architects of the Spanish Renaissance and designer of the cathedral of Jaén as well as many of the main edifices built in Úbeda at that time. The royal architect Luis de Vega (d.1562) is believed to have collaborated in the building's design. It is not known precisely when building work began, but documentary evidence suggests it was during the 1540s. There is a record of welding and carpentry being carried out early in the 1550s. The construction was completed in early in the 1570s. Dean Ortega did not live in the palace as he died in 1571.

The Úbeda Parador's original building was built of stone in a classical Renaissance style, typical of Úbeda and the neighbouring town of Baeza. It had an almost rectangular layout on two floors surrounding a spacious central courtyard. The southern frontal façade onto the Plaza Vázquez de Molina is simple and restrained with a marked horizontal nature and symmetry. It rests on a prominent base with small windows to the sub-basement and iron rings for tethering horses. The main façade displays two series of six window openings, crowned on the lower floor with triangular pediments and on the upper floor with mannerist features. The principal door is almost in the centre (being slightly offset towards the west), the steps up to the level of the central patio framed by Doric columns on which two female figures with wings support a coat of arms. Two further windows at each corner of the upper floor are designed in a detail typical of the Hispanic-Renaissance period in Úbeda, their balconies each supported in the centre by a white marble column. They opened from the two finest rooms in the palace. The façade is crowned by a pronounced corbelled cornice with a frieze of large egg-and-dart ornamentation.

The central patio has a complete twin-tiered arcade supported by slender, Nasrid-inspired marble Doric columns. The arches were described by the historian (and in the 1980s, mayor of Úbeda) Arsenio Moreno Mendoza (1953—2021) as an architectural feature of "incredible grace and elegance". Each of the spandrels between the arches is adorned with a small mirror. They are said to be typical of the architectural style of Andrés de Vandelvira. Most of the major rooms of the palace were reached from the patio galleries.

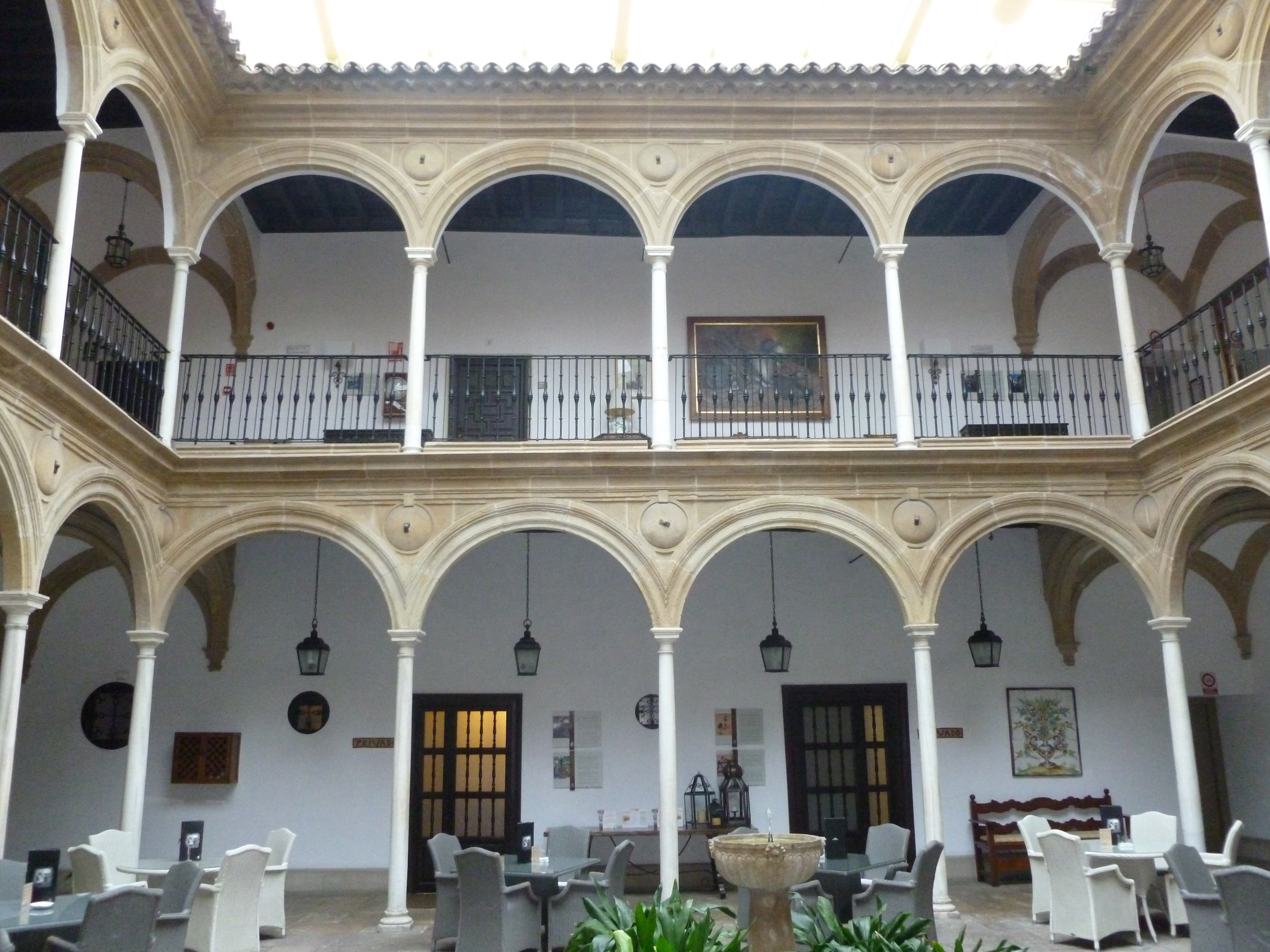
The central patio

A further small exterior patio was located at the eastern end of the palace. Access to it was by a carriage entrance from a side street. Goods were unloaded there. This patio was surrounded by storerooms and there were servants' quarters with wooden balconies on the upper floor.

A sub-basement of the palace was constructed to provide storerooms for food and household necessities. At a further level below that there was a network of vaulted galleries providing space for enormous earthenware jars for wine, olive oil and other foodstuffs. The sub-basement also housed a well which was connected to a subterranean cistern. During the building of the palace, Dean Ortega ordered the laying of an underground water pipe leading to the building from a spring located in the outskirts of Úbeda.

A walled garden was laid at the western end of the palace where Úbeda's fish market had once been situated. Seven cypress trees were planted there to provide shade.

A nephew of Dean Ortega, Andrés Ortega-Cabrío y Magaña, inherited the palace upon his uncle's death in 1571 and he undertook significant restorations and improvements within the building in the seventeenth century, but without disturbing the integrity of the original features.

The Úbeda Parador building remained in the same family until 1831 when ownership passed to the 1st Marqués del Donadío, Ángel Fernández de Liencres y Pando (d.1850), a senator of the Kingdom of Spain, a knight of the Orden de Santiago (Order of Santiago) and mayor of Úbeda. He replaced the Ortega coat of arms over the central door with that of his own. The exchange required the cutting off of the hands of the two stone figures supporting the original shield, a desecration that is still visible. The palace became known as the Palacio de Marqués del Donadío. It passed through the ownership of numerous members of the Donadío family until it was in the hands of one of the sons of the third Marqués de Donadío, Miguel Fernández de Liencres y Nájera (1869—1937) who sold it to the ayuntamiento (the city council) in May 1929. The council then gave it free of charge to the newly established Patronato Nacional de Turismo (National Tourist Board) in September that year for the express purpose of converting it into a Parador.

The selection of Úbeda as one of the locations for a state-run hotel establishment had been made by King Alfonso XIII of Spain and Prime Minister Miguel Primo de Rivera on a joint visit to the city on 14 January 1926 as guests of the Marqués de la Rambla. During a reception, local dignitaries complained that they did not have a guest house to welcome distinguished visitors to Úbeda. The King responded positively, encouraging the town authorities to find a centrally located building to house what would become one of the earliest Paradores.

== Conversion to a Parador ==
Úbeda, Oropesa and Mérida were the locations for the first Paradores to be converted from historical buildings rather than built anew, setting the pattern for scores of later Paradores; but as the entire building had been taken over at Úbeda, rather than only part (as was the case at Oropesa and Mérida), it was the first to undergo complete rehabilitation.

The architect chosen for the conversion was Ricardo de Churruca (1900—1963), the then consulting architect for the Paradores organisation and at the time finishing the design and build of the Hotel Atlántico, a new Parador in Cádiz.

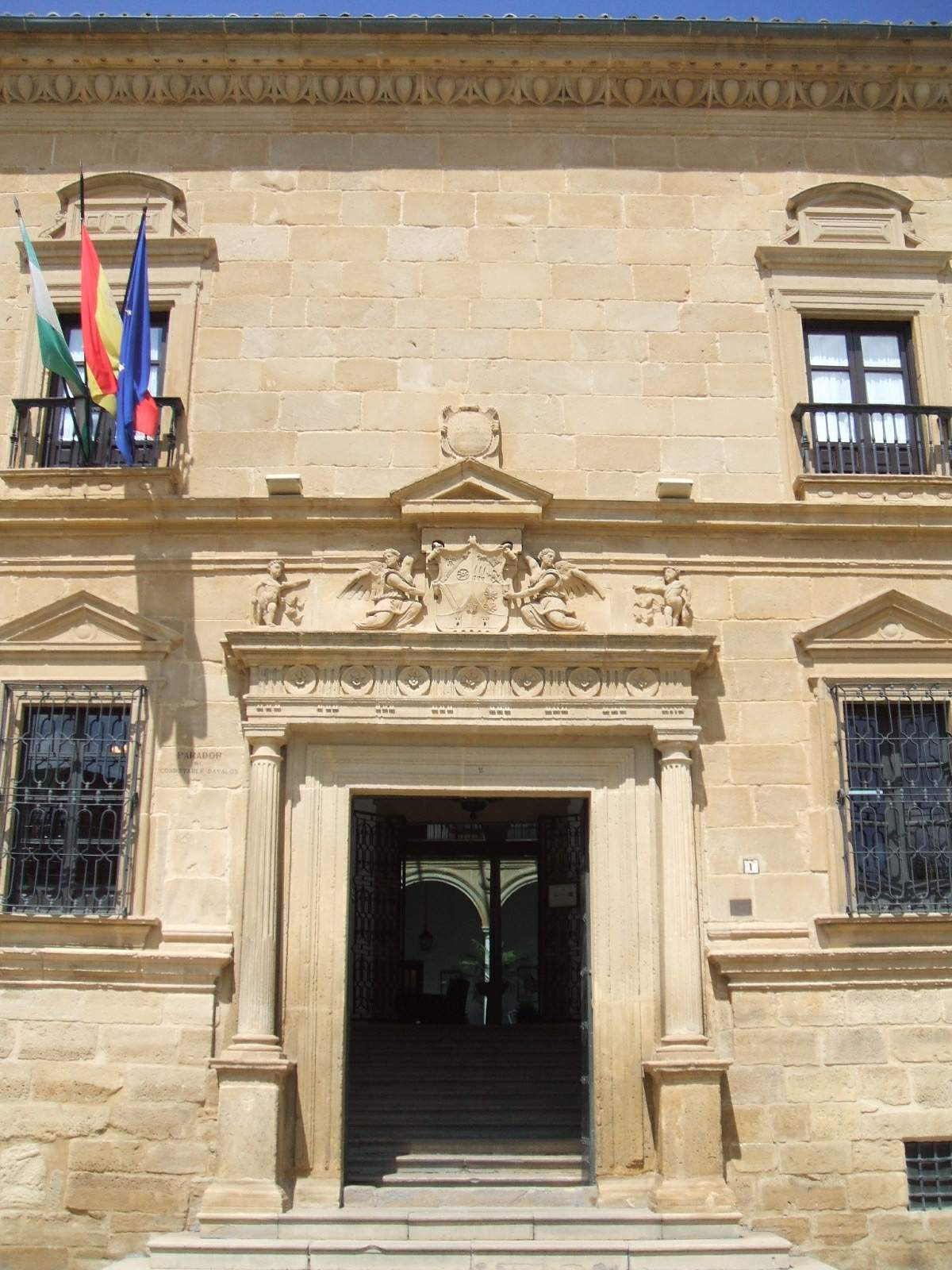
The main entrance

Aided by the contractor Juan Moreno Rus, Churucca worked quickly at Úbeda, keeping the conversion work to the essential minimum. The decision was made to install all the guest bedrooms on the upper floor, reserving the ground floor for the public and service areas. But firstly, consolidation and repair of the building's structural and decorative elements was required. The palace at that time was not listed as a Monumento Nacional (national monument), so the work was unhindered by preservation requirements.

Many parts of the building needed major intervention: the roof and parts of the frame of the building had to be demolished and rebuilt new, while decorative elements like coffered ceilings, cornices, architraves, windows, arches and general woodwork which had been damaged and poorly maintained required intensive repair and in some cases replacement. One of the most crucial areas was the central patio. The marble arcading around it was found to be in a poor structural condition and it required radical consolidation work beyond what had been planned. Four of the columns had to be completely replaced, using local white marble. Ironwork was utilised for bracing within the central patio and reinforcement, some of it hidden, was added in other areas. As the patio was open to the sky, the upper gallery, which provided access to the bedrooms, had to be protected from the elements with glass panels attached to the insides of the arches. The existing metal railing was preserved, though it is likely the original Renaissance one had been made of stone. At the same time as the works were progressing in the courtyard, a fountain was added in the centre. A wine cellar and bar area were built in the sub-basement of the palace, opening onto the small second patio.

When completed, the Parador was modestly sized with 10 double bedrooms and five single bedrooms for a total of 25 guests, with seven of the guest rooms benefitting from en suite bathrooms. There were two general bathrooms for the other rooms. The bedrooms were furnished in a simple classically Spanish style. Central heating was installed. There was a spacious living room and a dining room, both with wood fires. The public interior areas, designed with the assistance of the Marquesa de San Bautista, were a reminder of the splendour of the original Renaissance palace.

The Parador was first named the Hospedería del Rey but it was soon renamed as El Parador del Condestable Dávalos after the Úbeda-born Ruy López Dávalos (1357—1428), the Condestable de Castilla (Constable of Castile). It was inaugurated on 10 November 1930 and opened to guests the following day under the management of Pérez Benites and operated successfully until the start of the Spanish Civil War just under six years later in the summer of 1936.

== The Spanish Civil War, 1936—1939 ==
During the early months of the Civil War the individual Paradores fell under the control of whichever of the two major factions was occupying their locations. As a result, the separation between Nationalist and Republican Paradores was readily apparent. The Parador de Úbeda was in the area under the control of the Republican government along with six other Paradores and Albergues de carretera (roadside hostels): Áliva, Alcalá de Henares, Manzanares, Bailén, Quintanar de la Orden and Benicarló. Because of the hostilities the domestic and foreign tourist trade collapsed, but the Úbeda institution remained open. Discounts were offered to encourage guests, and government personnel and Republican servicemen and women were offered free accommodation when passing through Úbeda. However, as the months went on the Parador was faced with increasing and insupportable deficit. The Republican Government issued a decree to suspend the hotel's operations on 13 October 1936. The closure was brief, however, as the hotel was surrendered to the city council shortly afterwards. Before releasing the Parador to the ayuntamiento the Republicans took the precaution of preparing an inventory of the hotel's contents.

== After the war ==
After the war, with the Republican forces surrendering to Francisco Franco on 1 April 1939, the Parador network commenced a long process of restitution under the Francoist dictatorial regime, with the hotels located in Republican-controlled areas during the hostilities - like Úbeda - having to endure the effects of a "purification" process on anything or anyone associated with the Republic.

In the early 1940s the Parador at Úbeda was brought back under national control and reopened to the public on 23 December 1942. The years immediately after the civil war were bleak for the hotel industry. There were few foreign tourists visiting the Iberian Peninsula, the hostilities of World War II in the rest of Europe being a major obstacle to tourism. There was also a shortage of oil and food.

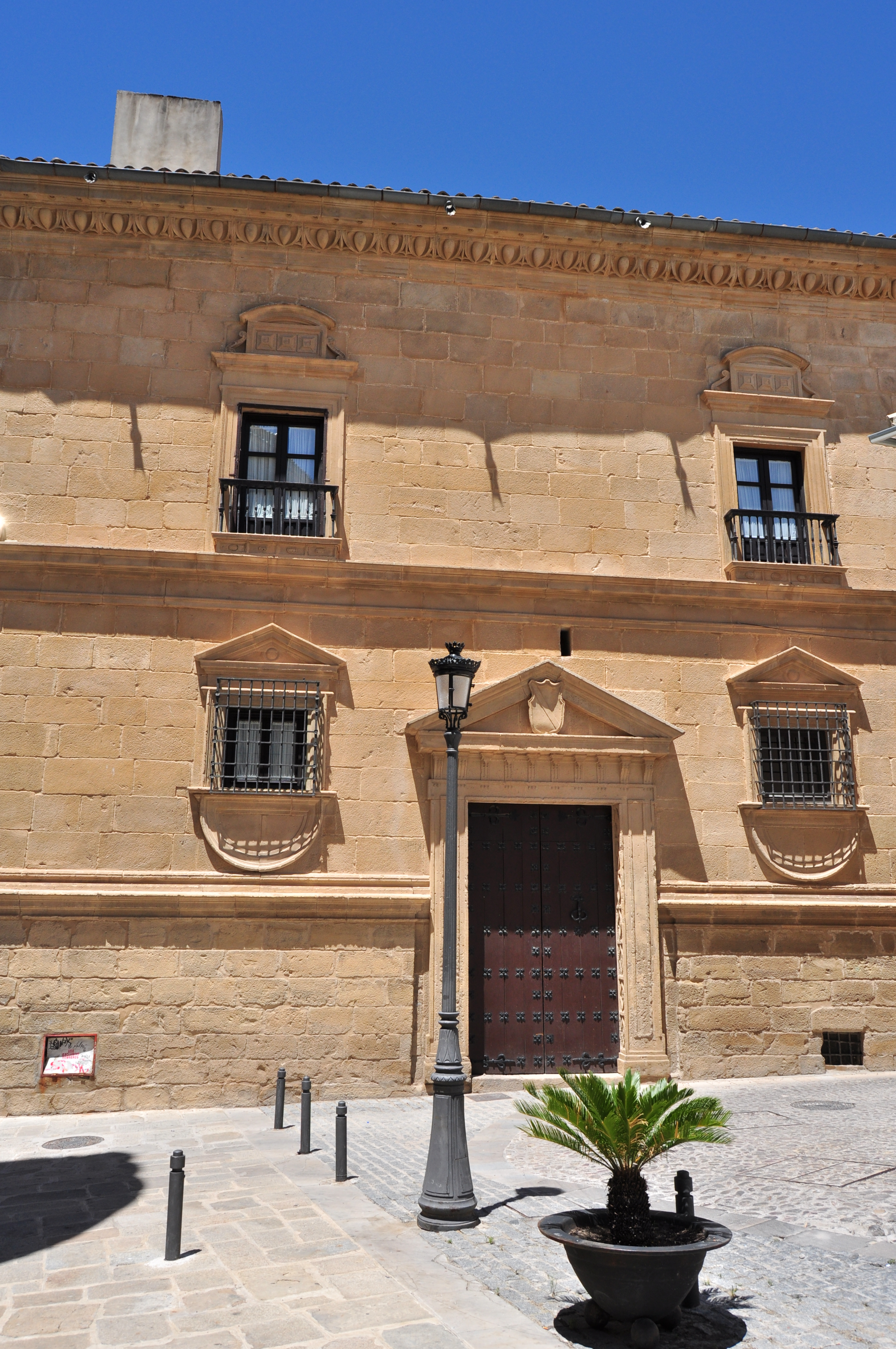
The entrance to the eastern patio

The Úbeda Parador was forced to use a primitive gasógeno (gas generator) to produce fuel for the kitchens and the central heating, and guests were required to produce ration cards for the consumption of food.

Despite these difficulties, in March 1944 authorisation was given for interior structural improvements and upgrading of the facilities at Úbeda, plans for which had been drawn up in 1942. The Parador's original architect, Churruca, had abandoned architecture after the civil war in favour of business, so the design work of the interior improvements was carried out by José María Muguruza Otaño, the architect of the Dirección General de Turismo (General Directorate of Tourism). There was no increase in the number of guest rooms from those in the Republican period.

In 1945, with the ending of World War II, the Francoist regime faced international isolation and sought to improve foreign tourism to Spain as a way of encouraging social and commercial amity with other European countries. One particular difficulty was the closure of the frontier with France in 1946. It was not reopened until 1948. Without foreign visitors there would be no recovery. But in that same year tourism noticeably recovered because it was a Jacobean Holy Year, when the Feast of St James fell on a Sunday and was celebrated in Spain specifically in Santiago de Compostela, but with other Spanish cities and towns also taking part. The government used this occasion to promote the Úbeda Parador and the rest of the expanding Parador network.

A brochure for the Úbeda Parador, published in 1950 with many illustrations, reveals its interior to have mostly bare walls, but with coloured rugs enlivening the somewhat dark, traditional Spanish furniture and decorative style.

== Expansion in the 1960s ==
The 1960s saw a growth in the Spanish tourist industry from four million visitors a year to almost 22 million. The consequence was a large growth in the Parador network together with remodelling and expansion of many of the existing Paradores, Úbeda among them. During the mid-1960s an extension was built onto the Palace at the rear, replacing houses on the Calle del Horno del Contador. The Parador's floor plan was originally rectangular, but the sixties' extension distorted the building's regularity.

== Plans for a new Parador in Úbeda ==
Lacking much room in the garage to the rear of the building, cars were parked in front of the parador to the detriment of the look of the Plaza Vázquez de Molina and views of both the Parador building and the church of San Salvador at the eastern end. In the mid-1970s, moves by the city council to pedestrianise the square combined with a desire by the Paradores chain to provide more guest rooms in Úbeda (which could not be added to the existing building) led to the study of the possibility of building a new, larger parador elsewhere in the town where car parking could be provided. The sixteenth century Hospital de Santiago on the corner of the Calle del Obispo Cobos and the Calle Redonda de Santiago was decided upon as a likely building for conversion. An architect, Juan Palazuelo de la Peña (1927–2007), carried out preliminary work on the project with a view to a conversion being carried out in 1977–78, but with the death of the dictator Franco in 1975 and the subsequent transition to democratic government the plans, along with many others in Spain, were reassessed and the project for a new parador was cancelled.

== Expansion in the 1980s ==
The new Secretary of State for Tourism favoured keeping the original Úbeda Parador for superior rooms but expanding the facilities, services and standard guest rooms into another building. Both the nearby Palacio de Francisco de los Cobos and the Hospital de los Honrados y Venerables Viejos del Salvador were looked at as possibilities for this expansion.

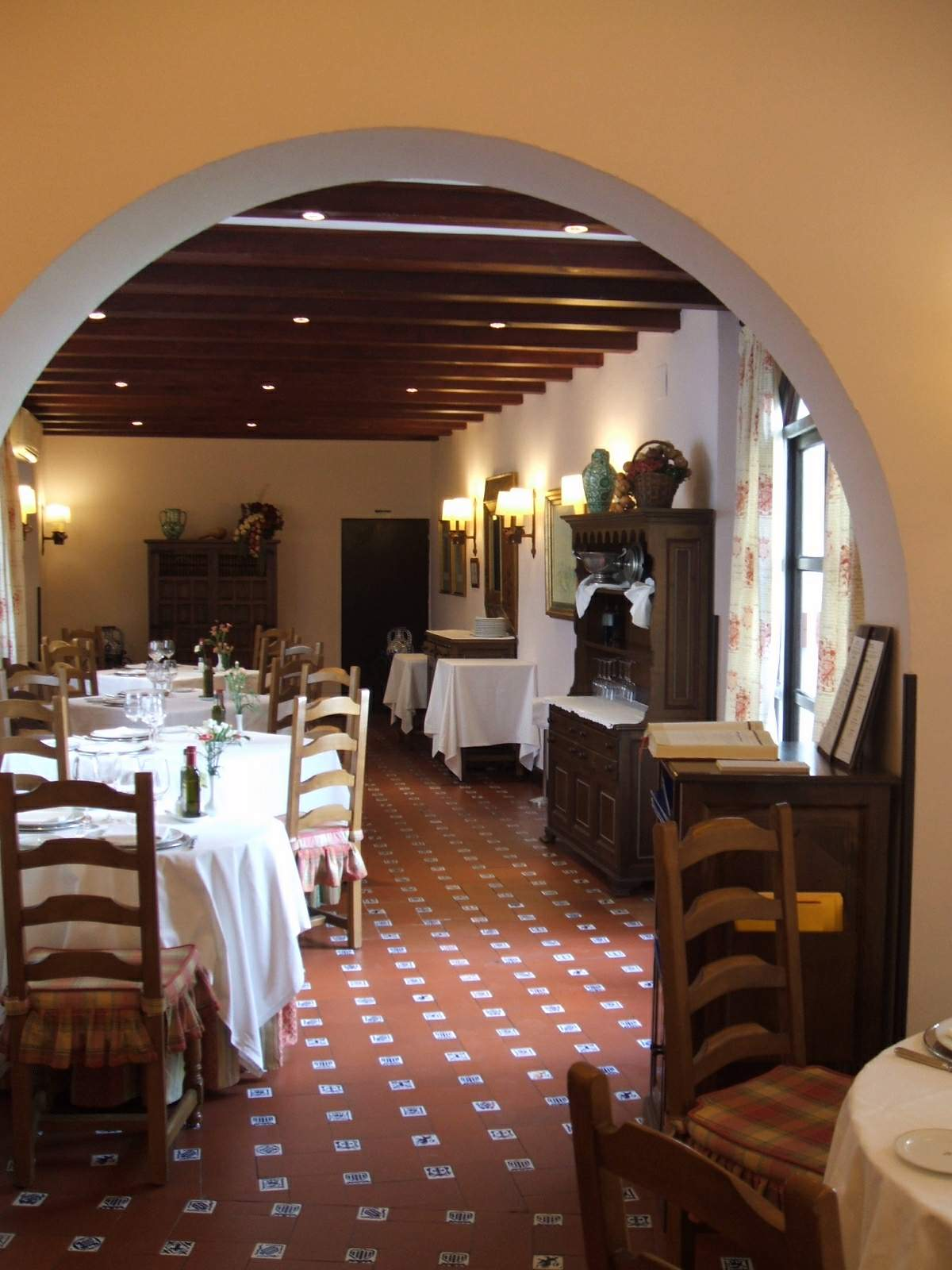
Part of the dining room

In 1984 two architects - Eduardo Amann Sánchez and Manuel Sainz de Vicuña y García-Prieto (1916—2014) (who over a long career had worked on developing at least 16 Paradores) - were appointed to investigate the Palacio and the hospital for possible expansion of the Parador while at the same time remodelling and updating the existing building which had greatly deteriorated in the previous few years "both in the obsolescence of its structural elements and installations and its inability to meet certain functional needs".

Sánchez and Vicuña enlarged the guest lounges at the expense of the existing dining room and kitchen. They placed the new kitchens in an independent pavilion and located the guest dining room and the function room - named the Salón del Deán Ortega - in what had been the staff quarters and the garage. Above this, ten double bedrooms were built, replacing chauffeurs' rooms and staff bedrooms. In the old part, three guest rooms were remodelled and upgraded, together with all the bathrooms. The main garden was remodelled to act as an outdoor extension of the new lounges. At the same time, the electrical, plumbing, heating and hot water installations were completely renewed, air conditioning was installed throughout and a lift was installed. There was also radical restoration of the roof, the stonework inside and out, the paving and woodwork and the panelled ceilings while in the main courtyard the columns and glassed-in archways on the upper floor were repaired while concealed guttering was installed.

The remodelled Parador was inaugurated in September 1986 but the plans to convert either the Palacio de Francisco de los Cobos or the Hospital de los Honrados y Venerables Viejos into a secondary additional Parador in the city were abandoned. As a result, the problem of a lack of parking remained, exacerbated by the loss of the original garage.

== Plans for expansion in the 1990s ==
By the 1990s, the demand for parking facilities and for further rooms to be made available at Úbeda had increased, so the Paradores administration purchased a collective-housing building, and the land behind it, immediately opposite the existing Parador on the Plaza Vázquez de Molina to provide further guest accommodation and facilities for car parking. The project was placed with the architect Carlos Rodriguez Martin who drew up plans with a view to inaugurating the additional establishment in 2000. When work began, the housing was demolished, but the façade was kept and supported by scaffolding.

As was usual, an archaeological investigation beneath the demolished building and in the land behind it was carried out. Multi-layered discoveries of major importance were soon made, including building works and relics of the Bronze Age and the Roman era, of the Muslim occupation, of the Christian medieval period, of the construction of the Alcázar de Úbeda and the building of the unfinished Renaissance palace of Rodrigo de Orozco Mexía de Molina. The remains were judged of such importance that the autonomous community of Andalucía ordered the building work to cease. As a result, the expansion of the Úbeda Parador was once again abandoned.

== The Parador de Úbeda in the 21st century ==
In 2001 the central courtyard of the Úbeda Parador, which had previously been open to the elements, was roofed in with a steel and glass structure, and air conditioning was installed, allowing the patio to be used as an indoor lounge. This weather-proofing allowed the glass infills to be removed from the arches of the upper floor gallery, restoring the courtyard structure to its original appearance.

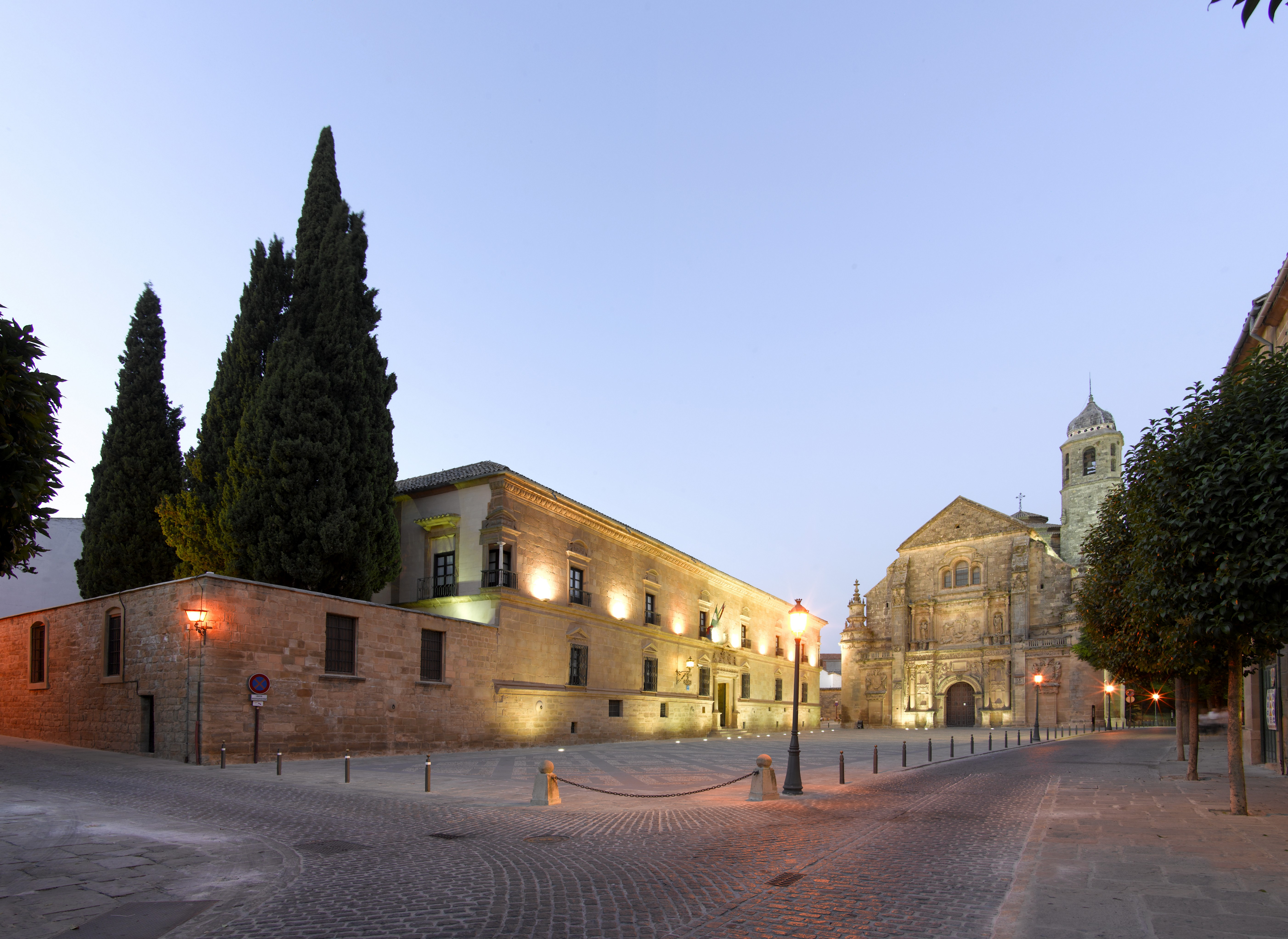
The parador (left) and the Holy Chapel of El Salvador of Úbeda

In January 2011, the Úbeda Parador became what the Paradores organisation called a "parador-museo". 24 information points were placed around the building, with explanatory texts in Spanish and English explaining the history of the building with old photographs, plans and further illustrations of the past of the palace, including its origins, the architectural character of the different spaces and the uses they had in the past, the people linked to the building, and the history of Úbeda.

Following the abandonment of plans to expand the Parador into another building at the end of the twentieth century, the Parador de Úbeda remains much as it has done since the 1980s, with 36 en suite bedrooms and the capacity for 72 guests.

In 2003 the palace was designated a Bien de Interés Cultural, classified as a Monumento (Monument) of cultural interest in the Spanish heritage register.
