= Vázquez de Molina Square =

Coordinates: 38°00′28.2″N 3°22′06″W

Vázquez de Molina Square (Spanish: Plaza Vázquez de Molina), situated in Úbeda (Jaén), in the Autonomous Region of Andalusia (Spain), is one of the best examples of Renaissance architecture in Spain. The Spanish Renaissance architectural value of this square was one of the motives for UNESCO's decision to declare Úbeda a World Heritage site in July 2003.

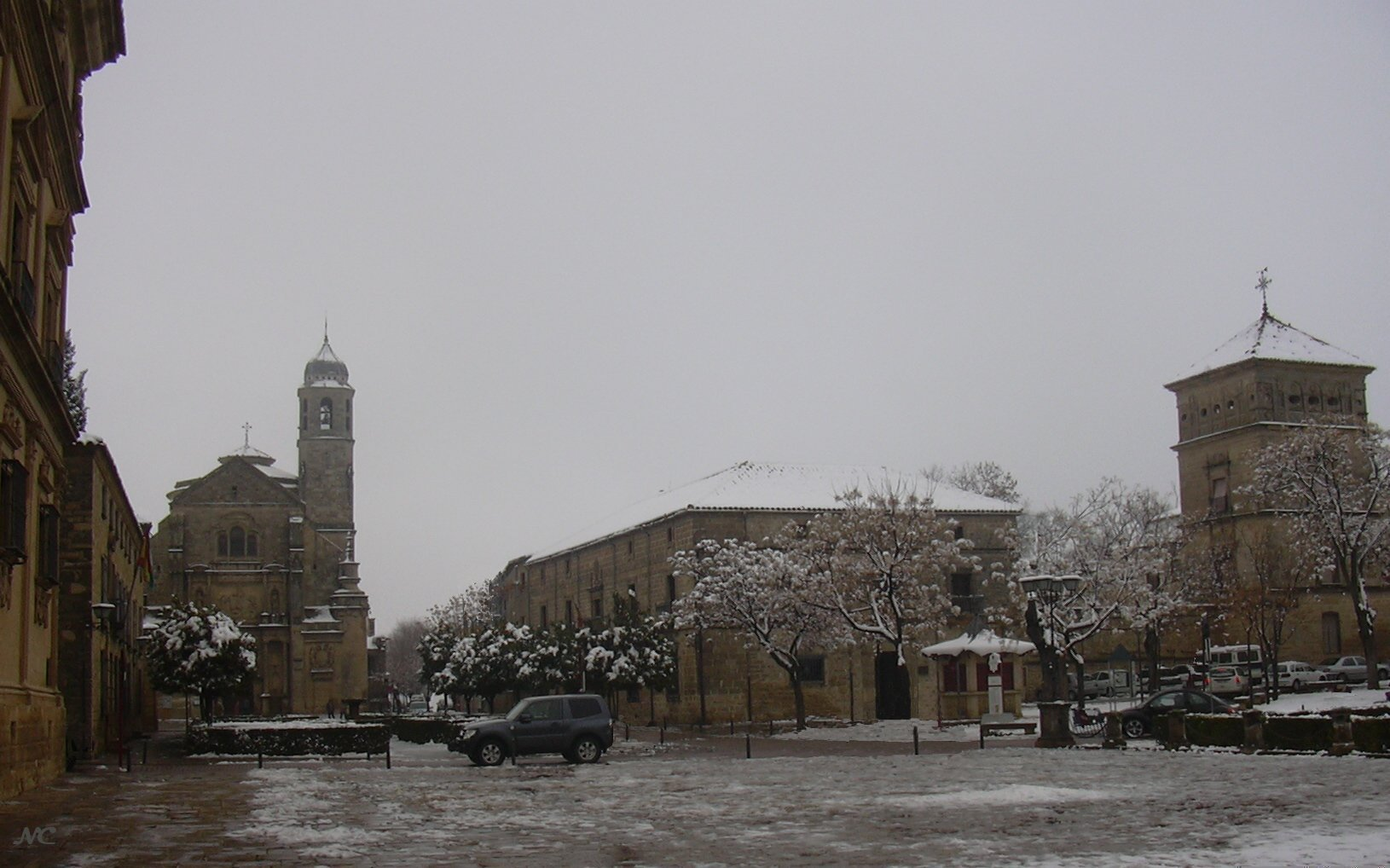
View of the square

Prominent buildings in this square are:

- Deán Ortega Palace (Palacio del Deán Ortega): a Renaissance palace designed by the Spanish architect Andrés de Vandelvira in the 16th century. Presently, it is a Parador hotel, one of the oldest in Spain.
- Vázquez de Molina Palace (Palacio de Vázquez de Molina): another building in the Renaissance style designed by Vandelvira, also known as the Palace of the Chains (Palacio de las Cadenas) because of the decorative chains which once hung from its façade. Juan Vázquez de Molina, Philip II’s Secretary of State, ordered its construction. It currently serves as the seat of Úbeda's municipal government.
- Basílica de Santa María de los Reales Alcázares: a church built on the ruins of Moorish Úbeda's mosque. It incorporates several styles, Gothic, Renaissance and Baroque. It was seriously damaged during the Spanish Civil War. It has been closed for restoration between 1983 and 2011.
- Holy Chapel of the Savior (Sacra Capilla del Salvador): Francisco de los Cobos, Charles V’s secretary, had this chapel built as his own pantheon. It was designed by the architect Diego de Siloé, and Vandelvira carried out its construction. This chapel is one of the town's most characteristic architectural monuments. Its façade, sculpted in stone by Esteban Jamate, is one of the most beautiful in Andalusia.

== See also ==
- List of World Heritage Sites in Spain
