= Dominican priory, La Guardia de Jaén =

Religious site in Andalusia, Spain

Church of Nuestra Señora de la Asunción
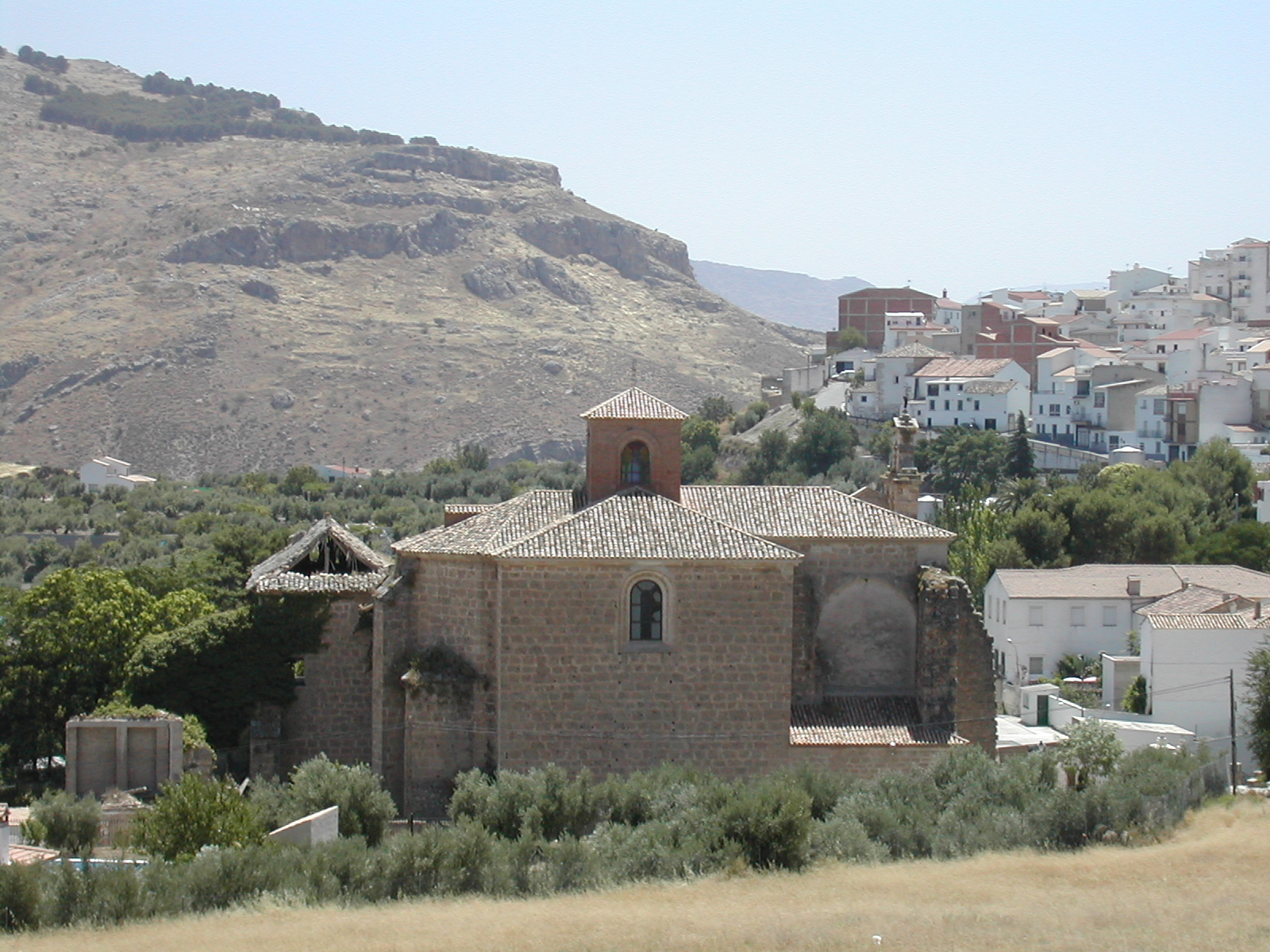

Religion
- Affiliation: Catholic Church
- Province: Jaén
- Rite: Dominican Order

Location
- Location: Jaén, Andalucía
- Country: Spain
- Interactive map of Church of Nuestra Señora de la Asunción
- Coordinates: 37°44′41″N 3°41′38″W

Architecture
- Architect: Andres de Vandelvira
- Type: Church
- Style: Renaissance
- Founder: Fray Domingo de Valtanás
- Groundbreaking: 1539
- Completed: 1577
- Spanish Cultural Heritage
- Type: Asset of Cultural Interest
- Criteria: National Monument
- Designated: 1975
- Reference no.: RI-51-0004164
- Statement: Decree 507/1975, of February 20
- Constructed: 1539–1577
- Style: Late Gothic, Renaissance, Mannerism

Website
- laguardiadejaen.com

The Dominican priory of La Guardia de Jaén (Spanish: Convento de Santo Domingo de La Guardia de Jaén), known from its dedication as the Convent of Santa María Magdalena de la Cruz (Spanish: Convento de Santa María Magdalena de la Cruz), was founded for a community of friars of the Dominican Order (otherwise the Order of Preachers) in the town of La Guardia de Jaén in the province of Jaén in Andalusia, Spain. Construction at the current location began around 1539. The priory was shut down and confiscated during the Trienio Liberal (1820–1823), and the buildings are now mostly ruined. The church however remains in use as the present Church of Nuestra Señora de la Asunción (Spanish: iglesia parroquial de Nuestra Señora de la Asunción). At first Gothic in style, its layout initially followed a design by Domingo de Tolosa. It was later extensively revised by Andrés de Vandelvira, who imprinted his personal Renaissance stamp on the church and the cloister loggia.

Although the contract signed by Vandelvira set an execution period of two and a half years, his work actually took 26 years, which led to a new commission for Francisco del Castillo el Mozo, who undertook the construction of the vaulted ceiling over the choir, the enclosure of the west end and the completion of the loggia (or gallery) of the cloister with the addition of a fountain dedicated to Mary Magdalene, the patron saint of the priory. This fountain is dated 1577, which is considered to be the end of this last construction period, and indeed of all construction on the convent.

After the priory was suppressed, the conventual buildings were partly converted for use for commercial purposes and partly abandoned and allowed to fall into ruin. The church was in use as the parish church by about 1850, the previous parish church having been reduced to ruins by the French in 1812. In more recent years, those conventual buildings which had not fallen derelict underwent further, more drastic conversion for industrial use by the San Sebastián Olive Oil Cooperative. After they left in 2007, the buildings suffered further from looting and partial collapse.

The convent of Santa María Magdalena is an important heritage site in La Guardia de Jaén and one of the greatest examples of the architecture of the master builder Andrés de Vandelvira, who gave the church an iconographic scheme of great value, and the only example known in his production of an octagonal chancel. It was both religious architecture and at the same time a funerary pantheon for his patrons, the lords of La Guardia. Authors such as Fernando Chueca Goitia have described the building as one of his most important works: [...] where Vandelvira renovated the church, creating a presbytery of great classical beauty and with certain traditional touches in the way of arranging the vaulting. The patio or cloister of this convent has an Andalusian elegance.

Both the parish church and the convent were declared an Asset of Cultural Interest, Monument category, by Decree 507/1975, of 20 February 1975.

== Artistic description ==
The church is the best-preserved of the buildings of the former priory. The rest are in an advanced state of ruin or have been hidden by the renovations of the last century, when the premises were occupied by an olive oil mill, as mentioned. After the ruin of the parish church of Santa María in the castle grounds, the priory church was eventually converted into the parish church of Nuestra Señora de la Asunción.

Decoratively, the church is in a pure classicist style, typical of the Vandelvira of the second half of the 16th century, with a Latin cross plan and a single nave, respecting the preferred forms of the Dominican Order. The chancel, dated 1556, is especially striking.

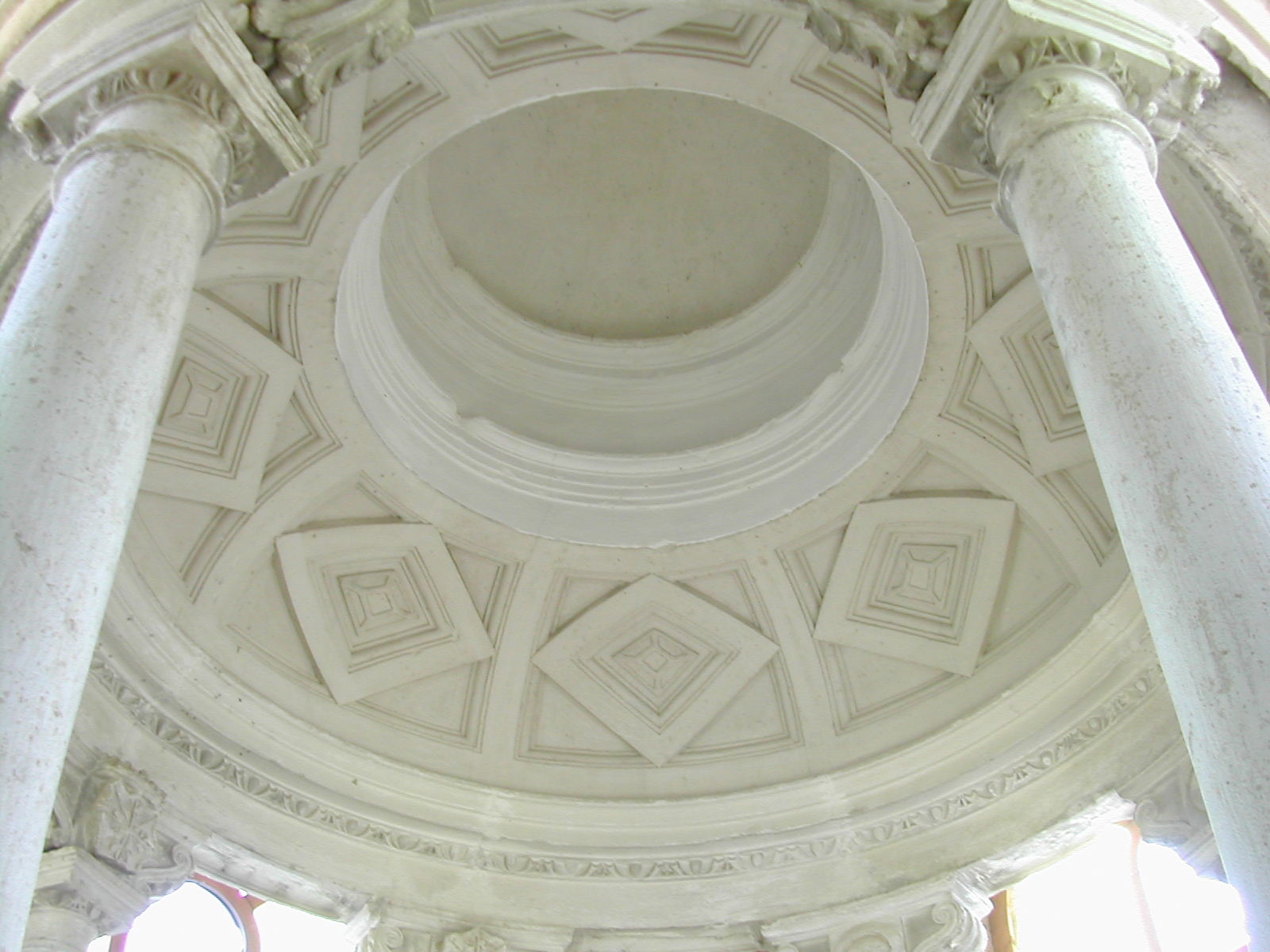
Detail of the lantern that crowns the vault of the transept

Over the transept the vault with tracery is decorated in its upper part by coffers, containing scenes of the Passion, and is open to the outside through a slender roof lantern, supported at its corners by four typically Vandelvirian semi-pillars, highlighting the detail of the three-angled corners as an elegant transition to the ceiling tracery. The lantern supports its dome on six free columns crowned with Tuscan capitals. To raise the height, there are bases decorated with various motifs: mirrors, the coat of arms of the Dominican Order and the arms of Messía and Fonseca.

In the corners of the ceiling of the main chapel are two squinches with shell alcoves, in which the arms of the priory's patrons Rodrigo Messía and Mayor de Fonseca are depicted again, flanked by angels. Above them are two pairs of virtues: Strength and Justice over the shield of Messía, and Faith and Charity over that of Fonseca. Covering the eastern end of the chancel is a quarter-spherical vault in which an extensive iconographic scheme is represented in individual coffers, including virgin saints, martyrs of antiquity, prophets and other characters from the Old Testament, the Fathers of the Latin Church and the saints of the Order. Presiding over the altar is a beautiful fresco of Saint Dominic, the order's founder, and above it the arms of the Dominican Order flanked by two greyhounds carrying torches in their jaws, the emblems of Saint Dominic.

At the west end of the church is a choir-loft under a three-ring vault, in the center of which is framed a relief of the Our Lady of the Rosary. Architecturally, it is evident that this vault is later than Vandelvira, as the texts attest. The wall of the west end is also thinner than the others. On the other side of it, in the outer corner opposite the bell tower some traces remain of a previous structure (possibly a compass or an unfinished construction), also leaving exposed to the open air the arches that support the aforementioned vault. These works lead to church's unfinished west front, which is abruptly closed off by means of a formwork wall.

Finally, it is worth mentioning the artesonado ceiling, which survives in the sacristy but was looted from the rest of the bays, where the 16th-century brackets and ceramic plaques have disappeared (the latter were reinstated in the plinth of the main altar). An inscription on one of the brackets in the sacristy shows the date 1547.

== History ==
=== Messía family, patrons of the project ===
In the Plaza de Isabel II is a Renaissance fountain with five bronze spouts, the inscription on which reads: ESTA OBRA M[ANDÓ] FAZER EL ILL[USTRÍSI]MO SEÑOR EL MARQUÉS DON GONÇALO MESSIA CARRILLO MI SEÑOR AÑO D[E] 1566 ("This work was ordered to be made by the most illustrious lord the Marquis Don GONÇALO MESSÍA CARRILLO in the year of Our Lord 1566"). Above it on a cartouche are two lions rampant supporting a now-missing shield. These two lions and the greyhounds that protect the shield of the Dominican Order in the church are connected through the Messía family, lords of La Guardia.

Images of the Renaissance fountain in the Plaza de Isabel II in La Guardia in Jaén.

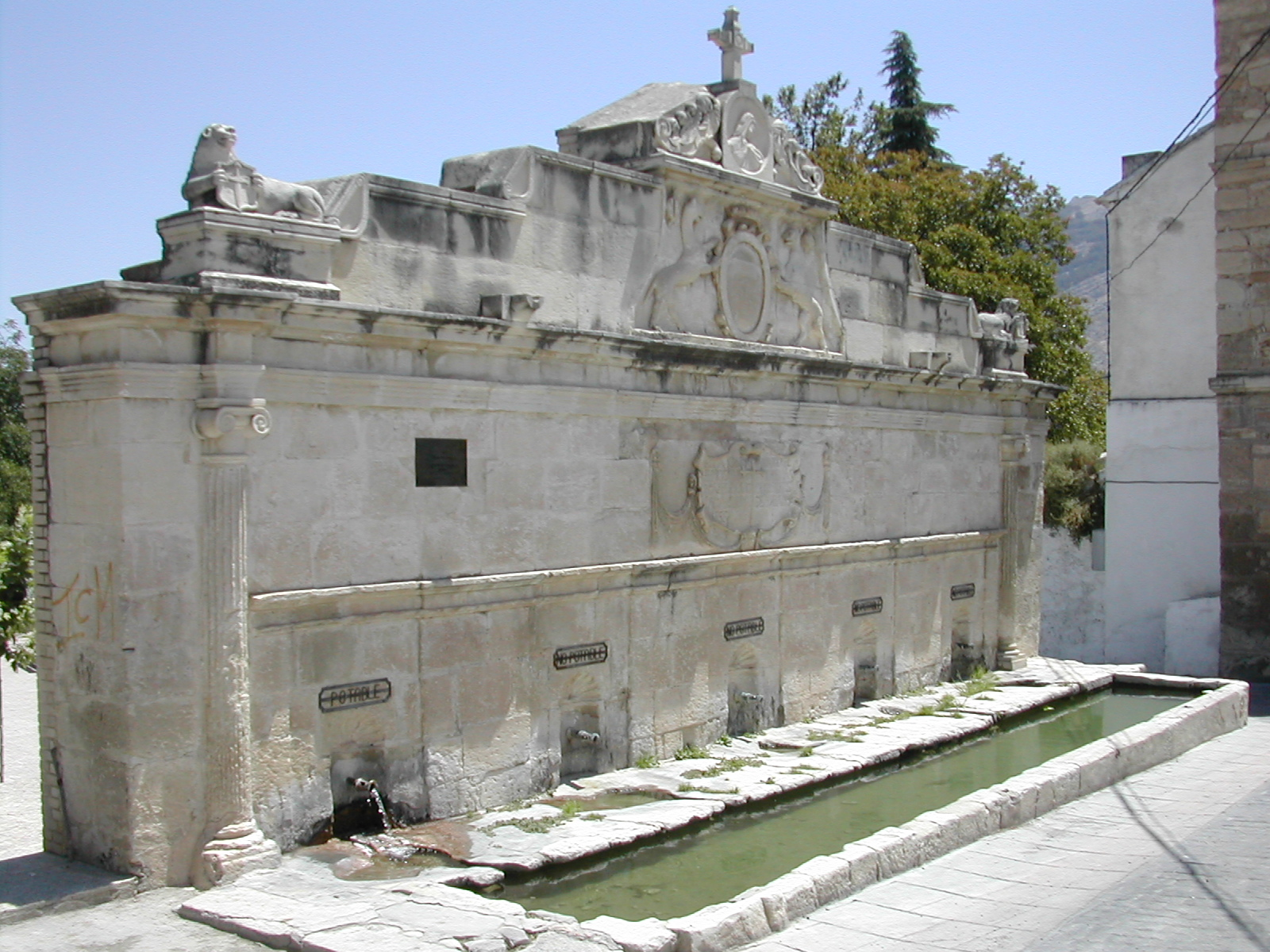
Fountain in the Plaza de Isabel II of La Guardia in Jaén, the work of Francisco del Castillo "El Mozo" (1566).

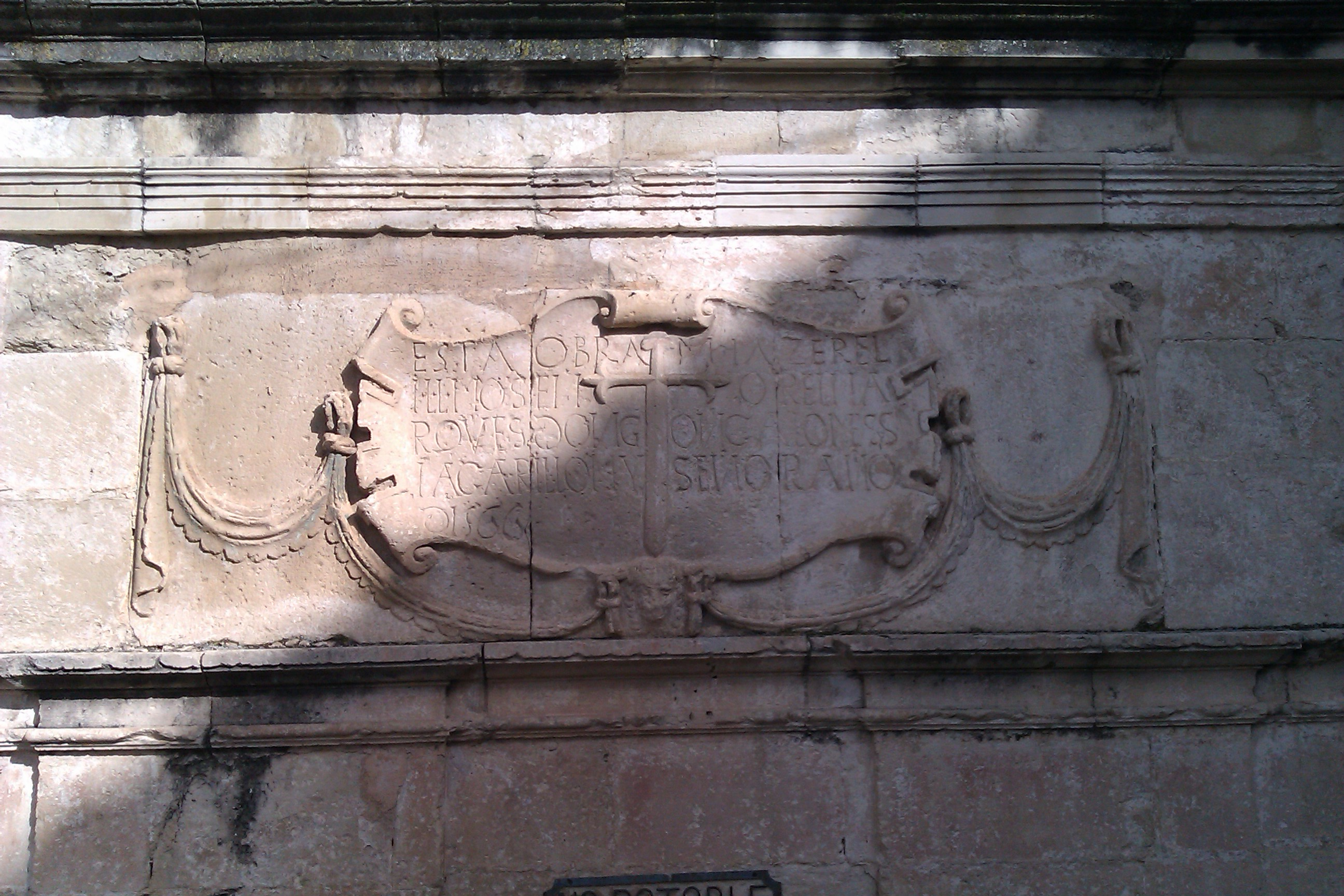
Inscription on the fountain.

The history of this family goes back to 1374 when, at the end of the Castilian Civil War, the new monarch Henry II of Castile seized possession of La Guardia from Lope Díaz de Baeza (Lope Díaz (or Ruíz) de Baeza y Haro, descendant of the house of Ruíz de Baeza y Haro) for his support of Pedro I "El Cruel". Ruiz or Ruy González Messía, now lord of the city, initiated a renovation, which began in the same citadel that he transformed into his palace.

1566, the date inscribed on the fountain, was another milestone in the history of the Messía family, the moment when Felipe II granted La Guardia the title of a marquisate when Gonzalo Messía Carrillo, Knight of the Order of Santiago, was named Marquis of La Guardia.

The fountain is located in a symbolic place, establishing a square halfway between the old town and the new Dominican convent to the northeast, where construction took place for more than 30 years.

=== Fray Domingo de Valtanás ===
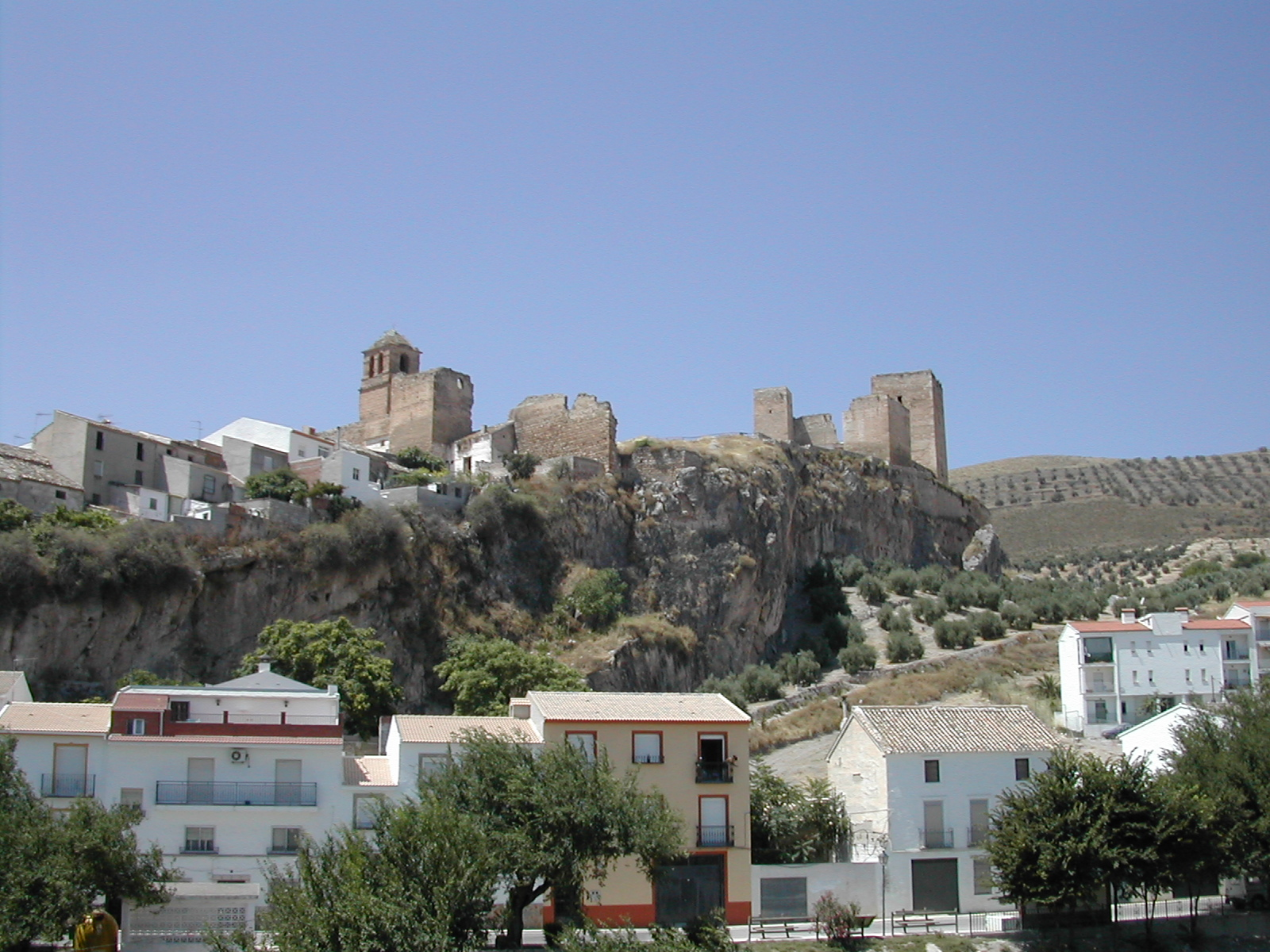
The castle of La Guardia de Jaén from the roofs of the Dominican priory

The history of the building began in 1530, when Fray Domingo de Valtanás decided to found a Dominican convent in the city. He was a preacher of the Order and also a relative of the lords of La Guardia who, in exchange for burial within the walls of the future priory church, from then on became the patrons and promoters of this work.

When work began on the residence of the lords, the castle-palace, they called the master mason of Jaén, Juan Rodríguez de Requena, the documentary evidence of whom begins in 1538, according to the date of a letter of payment. The texts indicate that he could not read, but Juan Rodríguez was the material executor of much of the construction on the priory, serving as the essential link that united the various projects and architects who signed his plan.

Only one year after this letter of payment to Rodríguez de Requena, the work was suspended, and then transferred to a peripheral area far from the castle, near the fertile plains of the Guadalbullón river, where a large orchard could be planted, while the friars remained in the residence of the lord.

=== Transfer and start of work ===
In 1542, the Dominicans, under the supervision and approval of the Messías, commissioned the project through a public tender, awarding it on June 20 to Domingo de Tolosa. Although he was in charge of the paperwork, the execution was subcontracted to Juan Rodríguez as director, and Francisco del Castillo "El Viejo" working for him, since De Tolosa needed to take charge of the works on the church of Huelma.

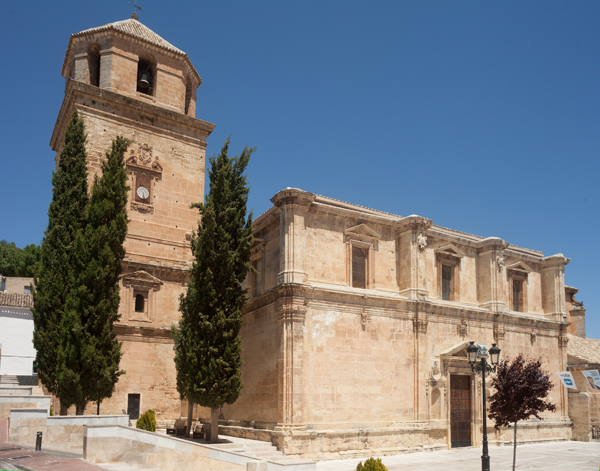
Church of Huelma

The tender set the execution period at three years, and construction on the church was to be completed in this period. Tolosa's plan, which clearly belonged to the Gothic taste that still remained in the early 16th century, consisted of:

- Like the church in Huelma, a flat chancel covered with a half-barrel vault with coffers for iconography
- Two vaulted chapels with coffers
- A transept covered with a traceried vault also similar to that of the first section of the church of Huelma (in which he used a stellar vault)
- A final vault at the west end similar to the previous one but without the side chapels

Once the designs had been drawn up, the friars paid the first instalment to Tolosa and the work began. However, on December 11 of the same year, 1542, the project was suddenly entrusted to Andrés de Vandelvira for no explicit reason. Some authors have suggested the possible death of Domingo de Tolosa as the reason. Francisco del Castillo "El Viejo" also abandoned the work, since with the death of Tolosa the contract was dissolved, and he had to attend to the work on the parish church of Huelma (where he would direct the works alone from then on), and on the town hall of Jaén.

After the death of Domingo de Tolosa, the Dominicans declared themselves owners of the project, having made a first payment and with the intention of continuing with its construction. However, this time the aesthetic tastes of their patrons were decisive.

=== Andrés de Vandelvira's project ===
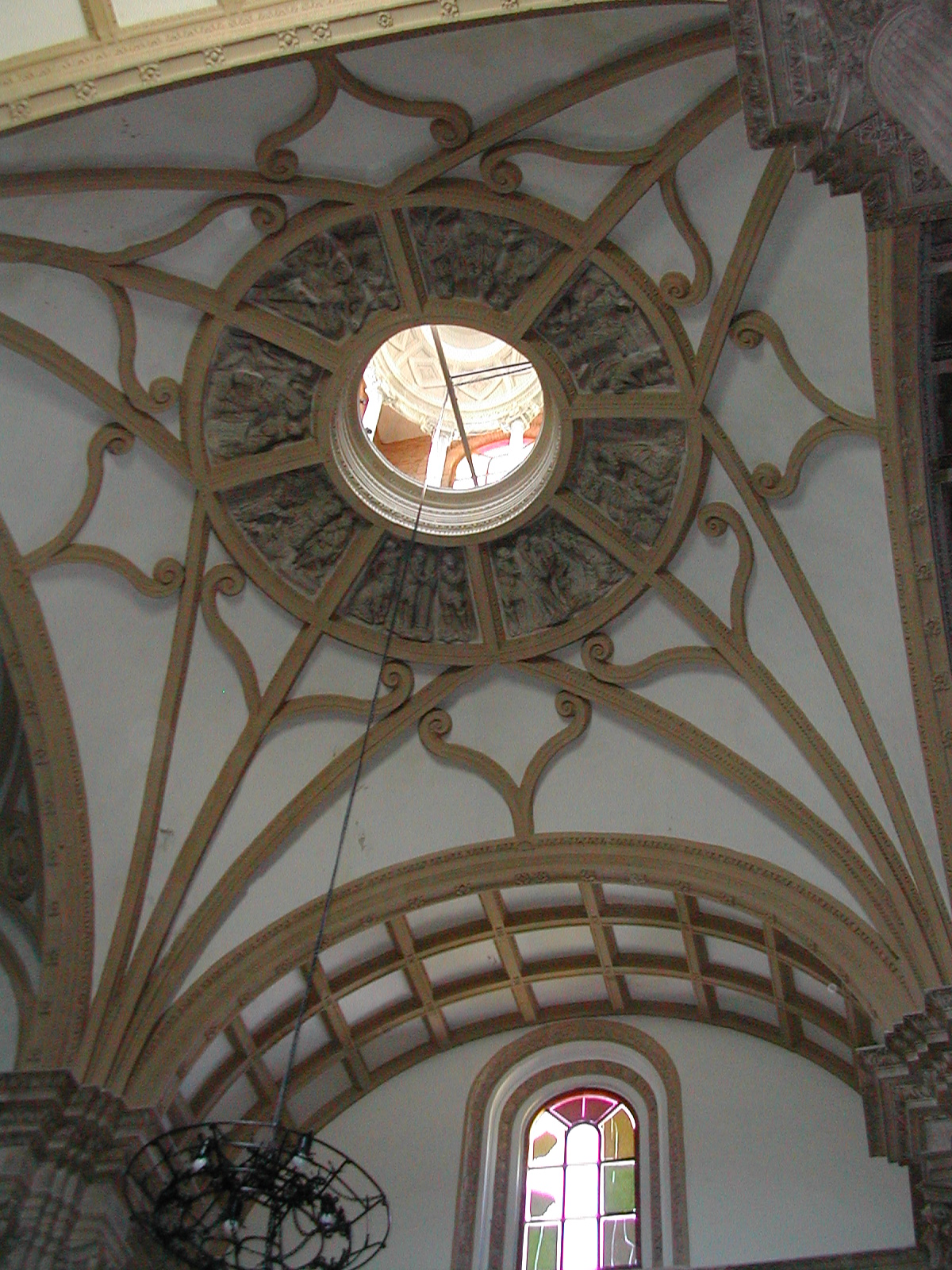
Crossing of the transept of the church. Both the plastering and the contrasting coloration in the tracery are due to recent works.

At that time, Andrés de Vandelvira, 33 years old, had already achieved considerable fame thanks to his participation in the works of the Sacred Chapel of El Salvador in Úbeda. A large selection of architects, sculptors and painters were working on that church under the auspices of Carlos I's secretary of state and Knight of the Order of Santiago, Francisco de los Cobos: Diego de Siloé, who designed it in 1536, Vandelvira himself from 1540, the French image maker Esteban Jamete, the sculptor Alonso Berruguete in the primitive altarpiece of the main altar, and the Italian painter Julio de Aquilés and the master ironworker Bartolomé Ruí. El Salvador was private religious architecture, a true funerary pantheon for De los Cobos family, and it is not surprising that it aroused great admiration among all the nobility.

Rodrigo Messía-Carrillo Ponce de León and his wife Mayor de Fonseca, patrons of the Dominican convent church, actively collaborated in its construction in return for establishing their funeral chapel there. As in the chapel of El Salvador, they decided to decorate their church with the new Italian aesthetics and to create a more ambitious work than the one previously tendered, all of which led to a long project that would breach contract after contract and all the signed deadlines given its breadth of ambition and scarcity of means, extending the work of Vandelvira over 26 years.

However, the contract of December 11, 1542, awarded without public bidding this time, established the conditions of the completion for the project with a total of 3,700 ducats and within a period of two and a half years: at the end of May 1543 the work should be at base level; in June 1544 at the height of the capitals; at Christmas 1544 the walls should be finished and the chapels ceiled; and the last deadline, in June 1545, should be dated and finished. For this, Andrés de Vandelvira, accepted the following team as guarantors:

- Juan Rodríguez de Requena, who once again acted as a quantity surveyor, and his son Cristóbal de Requena
- The stonemason Miguel Ruiz de la Peña, a resident of Jaén like the previous stonemasons, who had made a name for himself in the execution of numerous public works such as mills, bridges and ditches
- Cristóbal Fernández de Baena and his son Lucas Fernández
- The painter Lucas Quiterio, also a resident of Jaén, and close to the circle of Pedro Machuca (he had worked on gilding an altarpiece in the Jaén church of Saint Ildephonsus)
- Juan de Reolid, a carver from Jaén (who had also worked on the aforementioned altarpiece)

After signing the contract, Vandelvira signed another in which he added Juan Rodríguez de Requena as a partner in the work and transferred half of the work (as well as half of the contracted price), actually using this contract to establish Requena as the true material executor of the works due to the various commitments of the architect.

Although Domingo de Tolosa's plans were the basis for the project, due to the influence of the lords of La Guardia and of Andrés de Vandelvira himself, the following major changes were included:

- Substitution of the half-barrel vault of the chancel for the quarter-sphere vault, divided into coffers to house iconographic reliefs. As a transition from the ground plan to the vault, he proposed an intermediary octagonal layer (actually an open octagon without three of its sides) whose entablature rested on squinches containing shell alcoves containing the symbols of the founders of the convent, Rodrigo Messía and Mayor de Fonseca.
- In the traceried vault of the transept, initially blind, he included a roof lantern.
- At the west end he planned a rectangular chapel, covered with another vault similar to that of the transept.
- Lastly, he added as a novelty his own characteristic support structure, reinterpreting the conventional cruciform pillar as a three-edged corner, a completely unique detail in all his architectural production (although previously used, for example, in Granada Cathedral), and arranging these edges as a transition to the tracery of the vaults.

Once construction began, the friars felt the need to relocate next to the church as soon as possible, for which purpose they agreed with Vandelvira on the additional extension of the various convent rooms.

This was the last work of the architect in La Guardia: in 1568, at the age of 59, he dated the lower gallery of the cloister and his name did not appear in a new contract. His former patrons, Rodrigo Messía and Mayor de Fonseca, had died, as well as the quantity surveyor Requena. In addition, the then lord, the Marquis of La Guardia Gonzalo Messía Carrillo, was not as financially involved in the construction, whose duration had tired both lords and friars, who demanded a new architect capable of completing the building. The name of Francisco del Castillo "El Mozo", who had built for the marquis the commemorative fountain in the Plaza de Isabel II and the bell tower of the parish church on the castle grounds, came to mind and he was called to the Dominican priory.

=== Francisco del Castillo "El Mozo" ===
Francisco del Castillo "El Mozo" took charge of the work at the age of 42, when he was fully experienced as an architect. He arrived at La Guardia around 1570 to finish the cornice of the main chapel (an object of the 1564 contract that Vandelvira was unable to comply with) and the doorway of the church, as well as the upper gallery of the cloister loggia, an additional room and decoration of the convent. In 1576, the last documented year of contracting work, he managed to settle the cornice while at the same time building two exterior buttresses at the east end to help take the weight of the vault on the structure.

On July 28, 1576, a contract was dated for the completion of the two remaining side chapels, with the stonemasons Miguel Sánchez and Hernando de Benavides and the bricklayer Martín González de Moya, all of them residents of Jaén, working on them. The chapels, with a square floor plan, were covered with vaults in a clear Mannerist language. The contract, based on the proposal drawn up by Castillo, also included the completion of the church roof, the pillars to support the choir-loft (which therefore had not yet been completed) and various minor tasks such as the construction of a confessional. Equally attributable to Castillo is the vault that closes the west end, with a relief of the Virgen del Rosario, very much related to his work on the third section of the church of Huelma.

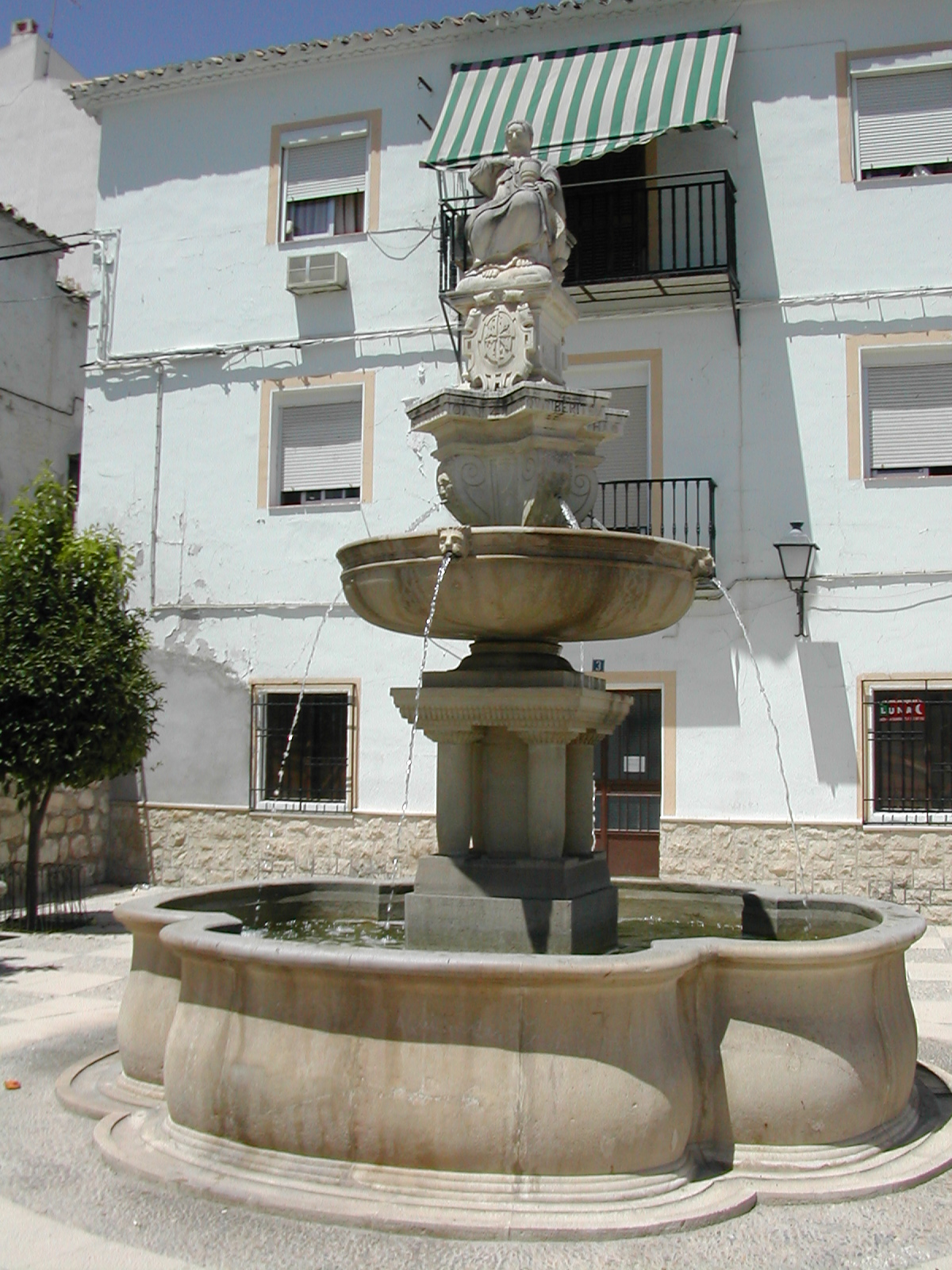
Recent reproduction of the fountain that stood in the cloister of the convent. The original piece is located in the courtyard of the Palace of the Provincial Council

In the cloister he continued the work of Vandelvira. The documents mention that Vandelvira had left numerous stones already carved and that the lower gallery was not completely finished. Castillo executed the fountain, dedicated like the convent itself to Saint Mary Magdalene (Santa María Magdalena), because of the date of birth of the founder Fray Domingo de Valtanás on the saint's feast day, July 22. As for the cloister, he added the start of new arches on the sides to prepare for the other bays to be completed in the future, which would never be done, as the Dominicans now prioritized functionality over pure ornament, a new decision that highlighted a lack of economic resources and a need to end the construction.

The main researcher of the La Guardia convent, Soledad Lázaro Damas, pointed out that the cloister fountain occupied its original place from 1577, the year it was dated, until 1954, when it was donated by its then owners to the Instituto de Estudios Giennenses (Institute of Jaén Studies), on condition that it be placed in the courtyard of the Provincial Museum. Because of abandonment the head of the statue of Mary Magdalen on the fountain had been looted. The fountain was not moved until the following year, 1955, although it was later forgotten in the gardens of the Museum while it was occupied by the troops of the garrison. Six years later, when the archaeological museum of the Instituto de Estudios Giennenses was created in the lower galleries of the Provincial Palace, the fountain was moved to its current location. Since it was necessary to carve a new head for the main sculpture, the architect Manuel Millán was commissioned to do so.

The inscription on the fountain reads: "QUI BIBERIT EX AQUA HAC SITIET ITERUM QUI AUTEM BIBERIT AQUAM QUAM EGO DABO EI NON SITIET IN AETERNUM. JOAN 4 AN. 1577" ("Whosoever drinketh of this water shall thirst again: but whosoever drinketh of the water that I shall give him shall never thirst. John 4 Year 1577") Around the top of the fountain the arms of the Dominican Order and the Messía family alternate with two other very poorly preserved inscriptions, alluding to the role of the Dominicans in safeguarding the faith.

The sculpture of Mary Magdalene bears a stylistic relationship to the allegories of Justice and Prudence that Castillo executed in the same year of 1577 in building the old jail and the town hall of Martos. In this case, Castillo chose the already archaic iconography of the myrrh-bearing Magdalene (Spanish: Magdalena Mirófora, with her hair loose and carrying a glass of perfumes in her hand, clearly opposed to the Penitent Magdalene which was being imposed by the Trent Counter-Reformation (1545-1563). The hair and the glass of perfumes refer directly to the episode narrated in Luke 7:36-50. In it, Christ was having dinner at the house of Simon the Pharisee when Mary Magdalene entered and knelt at Jesus' feet, which she washed with tears, dried with her hair, kissed, and anointed with the perfume that she carried in a glass of alabaster, whereupon she was redeemed with the words: "Her many sins are forgiven her, for she has loved much". The joint meaning of the La Guardia fountain is, therefore, that of salvation, symbolized by the figure of the saint and through the water, endowed with meaning in the main inscription.

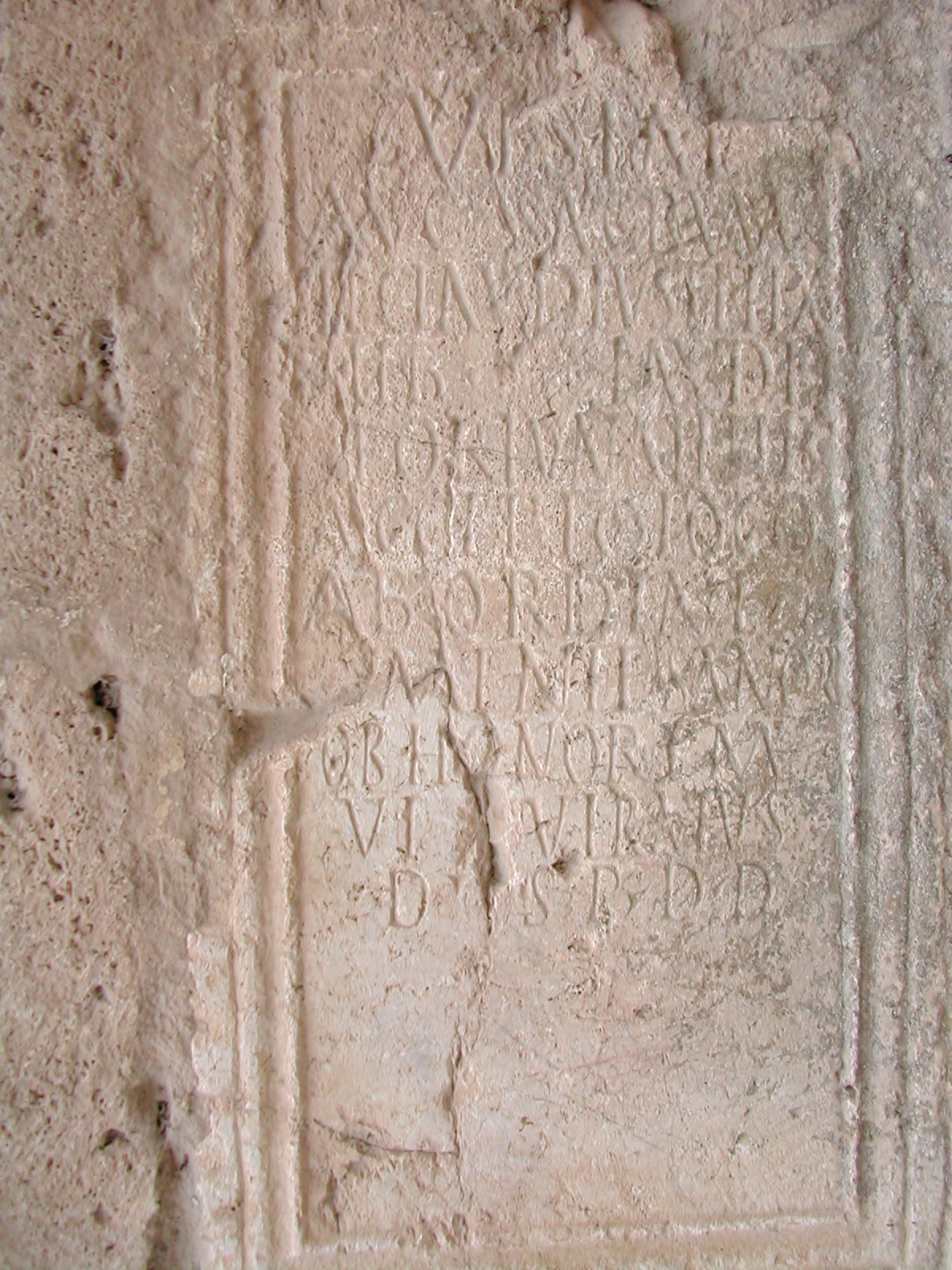
On the west front of the church can be found a Roman pedestal used as ashlar. A reproduction of this inscription made in plaster by Manuel de Góngora at the end of the 19th century is preserved in the National Archaeological Museum. This practice, well-known in Renaissance works, served to exalt classical antiquity, where this architectural style found its roots. One of the best examples in the province of Jaén is the town hall of Martos, also by Castillo.

Prior to the construction of the fountain, which could be considered the last documented work, between 1573 and 1574 there is evidence of masonry and carpentry work around the cloister, making a coffered ceiling of wood and tiles to cover the two galleries. For this, in 1573 the services of the highly valued master carpenter from Jaén, Miguel De Quesada, and the bricklayer Miguel Hernández Santo were hired. The work, supervised by Castillo, also included building a room on the upper floor and a series of repairs and improvements to the roofs, all of which can be attributed to Hernández Santo.

Regarding De Quesada, because of the nature of his contract, Soledad Lázaro believes that he was the one who made the coffered ceiling of the northeast wing of rooms, beautifully decorated with 26 brackets, of which today there are only three, the rest having been looted. However, the same author notes that the coffered ceiling of 1573 was to be made according to a sample that the convent already had, referring in the contract to "coffered ceilings, rosettes, etc." A year later, in 1574, a contract was signed with Castillo to carry out the upper floor of the loggia. Therefore, it is more probable that, instead of making the coffered ceiling of the northeast wing, Miguel De Quesada rather elaborated the decoration of the upper floor of the cloister loggia, which was not finished and therefore not yet covered.

Currently, this coffered ceiling from 1573 is dismantled, and its remains may correspond to those deposited on the first floor of the tower and the second of the northeast wing. According to the pieces that are preserved, its complicated framework could certainly be attributed to a "prized master" like De Quesada, and they do have decorative rosettes. Lázaro further describes that the wooden decoration could be completed with tiles, which would fit framed between the pieces.

Of the tilework of the upper floor of the cloister gallery, also vanished and looted, only the pieces reintegrated into the plinth that decorates the main altar of the church are preserved, which are of the same manufacture and were relocated (some sectioned in pieces) recently when the loggia of the cloister fell into ruins. Made of polychromatic cuerda seca, they were intended to form an ornamental ensemble between panels decorated in relief with flowers, which could equally have been polychrome, or designed to be.

By virtue of what has been previously described, it can easily be deduced that all the convent's bays would have been completely finished by these dates, and these actions can be considered as consolidation and decoration.

The bell tower of the church, crowned by a weather vane representing an angel with a trumpet, can also be attributed to Castillo. The element of the tower, moreover, was the only one that completed the west front, which would remain permanently unfinished, the present visible inserts being the result of unfortunate recent actions.

This unfinished aspect of the convent complex undoubtedly responded to a lack of economic resources and to the various conflicts that the architects had with the Dominican promotion of the work. Although Castillo seems to have established better relations with the priory of La Guardia, both he and Vandelvira left written records that they were still owed payment for their management of the construction.

=== Transformation and abandonment ===
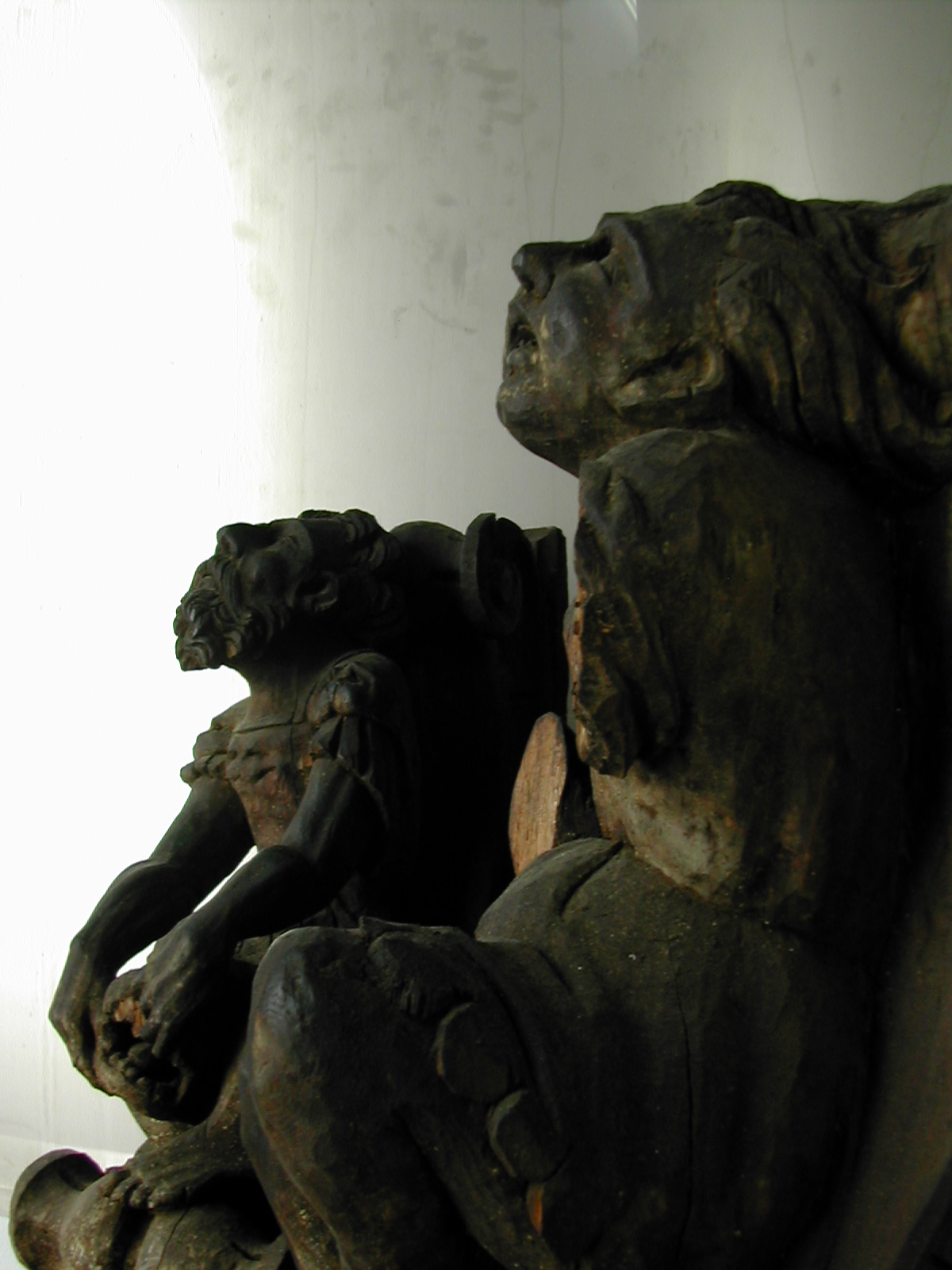
Two of the carved brackets preserved after the looting of the northeast wing. The whereabouts of a third are known, although the remaining 23 have been victims of looting

With the confiscation, the priory passed into private hands. The church served as a replacement for the ruined parish church, although the arrangement was not formalised until the end of the Civil War in 1939, when it was rededicated to Our Lady of the Assumption. The fresco of Saint Dominic on the main altar dates from the same year. It is attributed to the painter Manuel Serrano Cuesta, with whom Francisco Cerezo collaborated. It was one of the first works of their career for each of them.

Late in the 20th century, the construction of an oil mill, occupying the cloister and the eastern buildings, dedicated to the refectory and annexes, and the permanent abandonment of certain parts of the complex, led to the ruin of numerous elements. The northeast wing, containing common rooms and cells, was partitioned, transforming the space into a dwelling and warehouse for a flour factory, with which the mill (attached to the east end of the church) was associated. In 1962 and 1979 restoration work was carried out on the church, especially the replacement of the roofs and various decorative additions of different levels of success, such as the incoherent coloration in the tracery and the mouldings of the coffers that structure the vaults, as well as the misguided inserts in the attempt to beautify the unfinished west front.

However, lack of maintenance on the other dependencies of the convent caused the demolition of the flour mill in 1996 and the roofs' current pathologies of collapse, which have seriously affected the structure.

In recent times, looting has been carried out in a large part of the structures, especially the brutal sawing off of the carved brackets that decorated the aforementioned northeast wing (former private rooms of the convent); now the location of only three of the total 26 with which the room must have been decorated is known.

== Chronology ==
Note: plain brackets - ( ) - indicate documentary dates; curly brackets - { } - indicate dates from inscriptions on architectural elements.

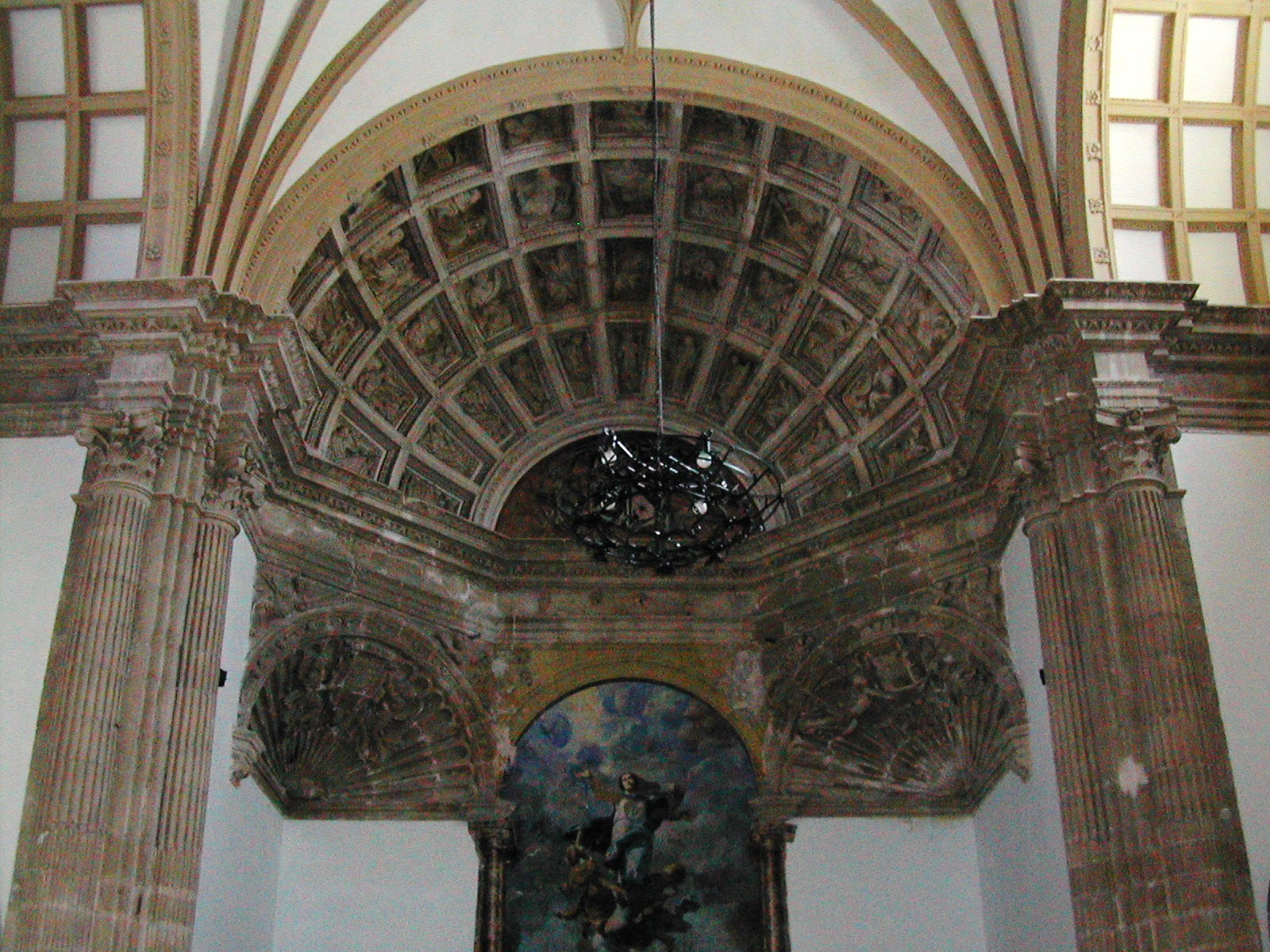
Quarter-sphere arch that crowns the chancel of the church, designed by Vandelvira

(1530): Foundation of the priory in La Guardia by Fray Domingo de Valtanás.

(1538): Deed of payment to the mason Juan Rodríguez de Requena, resident of Jaén. It is the first known attestation that the work on the convent - whose friars at that time lived in the castle - had already started.

(1539): Work suspended on the castle site and transferred to the site outside the old town walls that the priory remains still occupy.

(20 June 1542): The Dominicans contracted the new project to Domingo de Tolosa, with Francisco del Castillo "El Viejo" and Juan Rodríguez de Requena in charge of its execution, with a term of three years for its completion.

(11 December 1542): The project was contracted to Andrés de Vandelvira, Juan Rodríguez de Requena remaining as quantity surveyor until his death. Having paid the first instalment to Tolosa, the Dominicans became owners of the project, handing it over to Vandelvira for its execution in two and a half years, although he modified and extended it for a period of 26 years.

{1547}: Date on a text ribbon on one of the beams of the coffered ceiling of the sacristy. This shows that it is one of the oldest parts of the convent complex, perhaps started by Tolosa.

{1556}: Inscription in relief on the vault of the chancel of the church, the work of Andrés de Vandelvira.

(1564): Vandelvira's new contract with the friars, committing him to complete the cornice of the main chapel. He again fails to comply with his contract terms and conditions.

{1566}: Inscription on the cartouche of the Plaza Isabel II fountain, in commemoration of the fact that Gonzalo Messía Carrillo was elevated to the title of Marquis of La Guardia in that year.

{1568}: Cartouche inscription on the entablature of the lower gallery of the cloister, Vandelvira's last work. It is the same year as the death of his wife, Luisa de Luna.

(1568): The work was entrusted to Francisco del Castillo "El Mozo", after the breaches of Vandelvira and the defaults of the Dominicans. According to Soledad Lázaro, the documentary date of the contract was 1574, and in 1569 there is only evidence of his work on the bell tower of the Church of Santa María in La Guardia Castle.

(1573): A carpenter from Jaén, Miguel de Quesada, is hired to make the coffered ceiling [which?], probably according to the pattern of those already carved in the sacristy (the contract mentions a sample that the convent already had).

(1574): The mason Miguel Hernández Santo is hired to build a room on the upper gallery of the cloister and a series of necessary works and repairs in the convent.

(1575): Death of Andrés de Vandelvira.

(1576): End of the documentary record of the works of Francisco del Castillo "El Mozo"

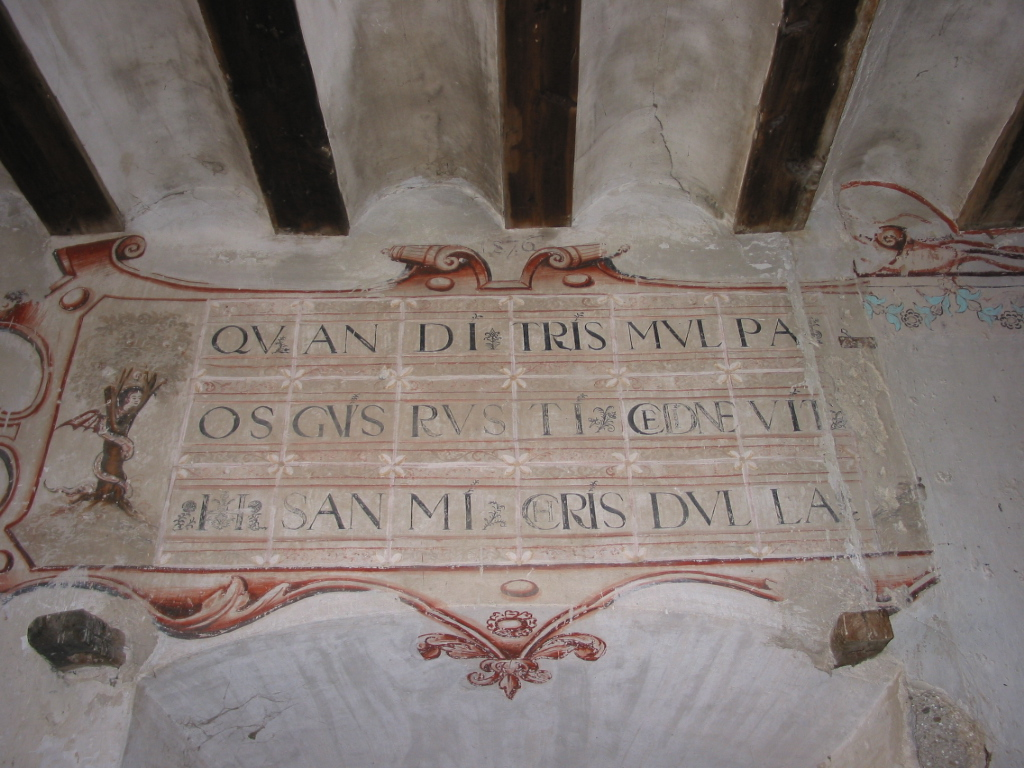
Frescoed phylactery [sic] on the second floor of the northeast corridor of the convent

{1576}: Date on frescoed "phylactery" (in the sense of a scroll of text) on the second floor of the northeast corridor of the convent, located above the door that connected this room with the northern staircase of the church. The Latin text is in arranged in boxes (as a false stoichedon) and reads vertically: "QVOS ANGVIS DIRVS TRISTI MULCEDINE PAVIT" (first and second lines) "HOS SANGVIS MIRVS CHRISTI DULCEDINE LAVIT" (third and second lines). Both sentences, read together, translate as: "Those whom the dark serpent has fed with terrible balm, the miraculous blood of Christ has sweetly washed". To the left of the epigraph is represented the serpent coiled around the Tree of Paradise (the same zigzag reading would allude to the shape of the reptile). On the right is a lost painting, presumably of Christ on the cross, as part of an arm of the cross and a nail are still visible. The authorship of this text, with slight variations, seems to be due to the Goliardesque poet Hugo Primas de Orleans (1094? - 1160), who used it as a symbol of the union of the Old and New Testaments: Quos anguis tristi virus mulcedine pavit; hos sanguis Christi mirus dulcedine lavit. However, the same readings can be found in texts such as the Album Joannis Rotarii by Johan Radermacher de Oude (1538-1617), which maintains the crossed sense of this reading, but this time diagonally, or in a marginal note on the back of folio 276 of the Codex Gigas (13th century).

{1577}: Inscription on the Magdalene fountain in the cloister, which Soledad Lázaro attributes to Castillo.

{1672}: Inscription in the keystone of the opening in the west front of the church.

{1680}: Inscription on top of coat of arms of the Order, the only remainder of the original gate of the main door, currently in sections and relocated on the front of the choir: SE HIZO ESTE CANZEL SIENDO PR[IOR] EL M[UY] R[EVERENDO] P[ADRE] P[ROVINCIAL] F[RAY] IVAN BUENO AÑO DE 1680. ("This screen was made the very reverend Provincial Father Juan Bueno being prior [in] the year 1680.")

== Iconography ==
Images at the east end of the church over the altar (according to Gila and Ruiz, 1984)

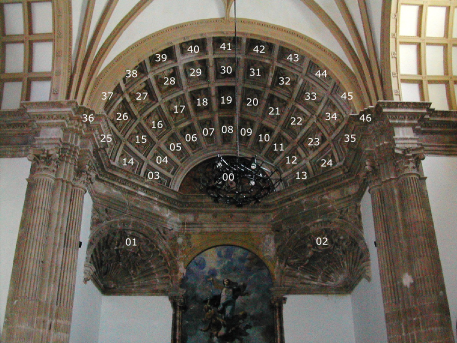

00. Arms of the Dominican Order

01 and 03. Arms of Don Rodrigo Messía

02 and 13. Arms of Doña Mayor de Fonseca

04. Saint Ursula

05. Saint Agnes

06. Saint Catherine of Alexandria

07. Saint Euphemia

08. Saint Catherine of Siena

09. Saint Eulalia

10. Saint Barbara

11. Saint Cecilia

12. Saint Lucy (Santa Lucía)

14. Jonah

15. Amos

16. Hosea

17. Isaiah

18. Ezekiel

19. David

20. Jeremiah

21. Daniel

22. Job

23. Obadiah

24. Malachi

25. Saint Augustine

26. Saint Vincent Ferrer

27. Saint Jerome

28. Saint Thomas Aquinas

29. Saint Lawrence

30. Saint Dominic

31. Saint Stephen

32. Saint Peter of Verona

33. Saint Gregory the Great

34. Saint Anthony of Padua

35. Saint Ambrose

36. "In the year"

37. Saint Bartholomew

38. Saint Thomas the Apostle

39. Saint Andrew

40. Saint Michael

41. Virgin and child

42. Saint John the Baptist

43. Saint Paul

44. Saint Peter

45. Saint Matthias

46. "1556"

Images in the church crossing (according to Gila and Ruiz, 1984)

I. Gethsemane

II. Arrest of Jesus

III. Flagellation of Christ

IV. Ecce Homo

V. Saint Veronica

VI. The Raising of the Cross

VII. Pietà

VIII. Resurrection

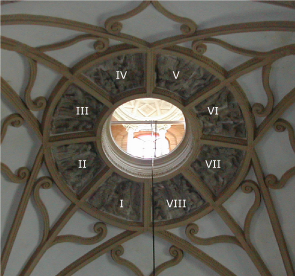

== Notes and references ==
- Ángulo Íñiguez, Diego (1971). "La iglesia parroquial de La Guardia. Jaén". Boletín de la Real Academia de Bellas Artes de San Fernando (33). Madrid.
- Argote de Molina, Gonzalo (1588). "CXXVIII. SVCESSION DE LA CASA DE LA Guardia en el linage de Mexia.". Nobleza del Andaluzia. Vol. Libro II. (impresión) Díaz, Fernando. Sevilla. pp. 249–250 (523 digitalizada). Archived from the original (img/jpg) on 18 January 2012.
- Becerra García, Juan Manuel (Dir.) (1993). La Guardia. Informe diagnóstico del conjunto histórico. Sevilla: Junta de Andalucía, Consejería de Obras Públicas y Transportes. ISBN 84-8095-017-X.
- Cazabán Laguna, Alfredo (1982). "Lo que fue convento de los dominicos". Don Lope de Sosa. Crónica mensual de la provincia de Jaén (119) (Edición facsímil ed.). Jaén: Riquelme y Vargas Ediciones, Jaén. ISBN 978-84-300-6832-6.
- Chueca Goitia, Fernando (1995). Andrés de Vandelvira. Arquitecto. Jaén: Riquelme y Vargas Ediciones. ISBN 978-84-86216-27-6.
- da Costa Felgueiras Gaio, Manuel José (1989). Carvalhos de Basto (ed.). Nobiliário das Famílias de Portugal (in Portuguese). Vol. 12. de Azevedo Meirelles, Agostinho; Domingos de Araújo, Affonso. 1938-1941. Braga.
- Galera Andreu, Pedro (2000). "La iglesia de La Guardia". Visitas al patrimonio histórico provincial de Jaén 94/99. Jaén: Colegio Oficial de Arquitectos de Jaén. ISBN 978-84-607-1610-5.
- Gila Medina, M.; Ruíz Calvente (1984). "El programa iconográfico en la iglesia convento de los dominicos de La Guardia. Jaén". Cuadernos de Arte (XVI). Granada: Universidad de Granada, Departamento de Historia del Arte.
- Gila Medina, L; Ruíz Fuentes, V. M. (1992). "Andrés de Vandelvira: Aproximación a su vida y obra". Catálogo de la exposición 'La arquitectura del renacimiento en Andalucía. Andrés de Vandelvira y su época'. Sevilla: Junta de Andalucía, Consejería de Cultura y Medio Ambiente.
- Jiménez Cobo, Martín (2004). "Las inscripciones romanas de Mentesa Bastia". Sumuntán. Revista de estudios sobre Sierra Mágina (20). Jaén: Colectivo de investigadores de Sierra Mágina: 117–144.
- Lázaro Damas, María Soledad (1985). "Iconografía mariana en la fuente de la Diputación y en la fuente de los Caños de Jaén". Actas de la I Asamblea de Estudios Marianos. Jaén: Academia Bibliográfico-Mariana «Virgen de la Capilla».
- Lázaro Damas, María Soledad (1987). Las fuentes de Jaén. Jaén: Academia Bibliográfico-Mariana «Virgen de la Capilla» (Excmo. Ayuntamiento de Jaén, Comisión de Cultura). ISBN 978-84-505-6232-3.
- Lázaro Damas, María Soledad (1988). "El convento de Santa María Magdalena de la Cruz, de La Guardia. Programa constructivo". Boletín del Instituto de Estudios Giennenses (136). Jaén. Excma. Diputación Provincial de Jaén, Instituto de Estudios Giennenses.
- Martínez Martínez, Noelia; Montejo Ráez, Alfonso L. (2005). Expediente para la mejora de la documentación del Bien de Interés Cultural Iglesia Parroquial de Nuestra Señora de la Asunción y Antiguo Convento de Santa María Magdalena de La Guardia. Jaén: Junta de Andalucía, Consejería de Cultura, Delegación Provincial de Jaén. "Documentación técnica sin publicar"
- Moreno Mendoza, Arsenio (1989). Los castillos : un siglo de arquitectura en el renacimiento. Monográfica Arte y Arqueología. Vol. 3 (1ª ed.). Consejería de Cultura, Granada: Editorial Universidad de Granada. ISBN 978-84-338-0896-7.
- Nicás Moreno, Andrés (1998). "Heráldica y genealogía en el reino de Jaén". Instituto de Estudios Giennenses (1ª ed.). Diputación Provincial de Jaén: 169–180. ISBN 84-87115-49-7.
- Ortega Bueno, M. (Dir.) (1997). "Jaén. Pueblos y ciudades". III: La Guardia (varios autores). Jaén: Diario Jaén, CajaSur.
- Salazar y Castro, Luis. Colección Salazar y Castro. Real Academia de Historia. 20268 del inventario / Ref. M-8, fº 63v-64.
