= Holy Chapel of the Savior =

Coordinates: 38°00′29″N 3°21′59″W

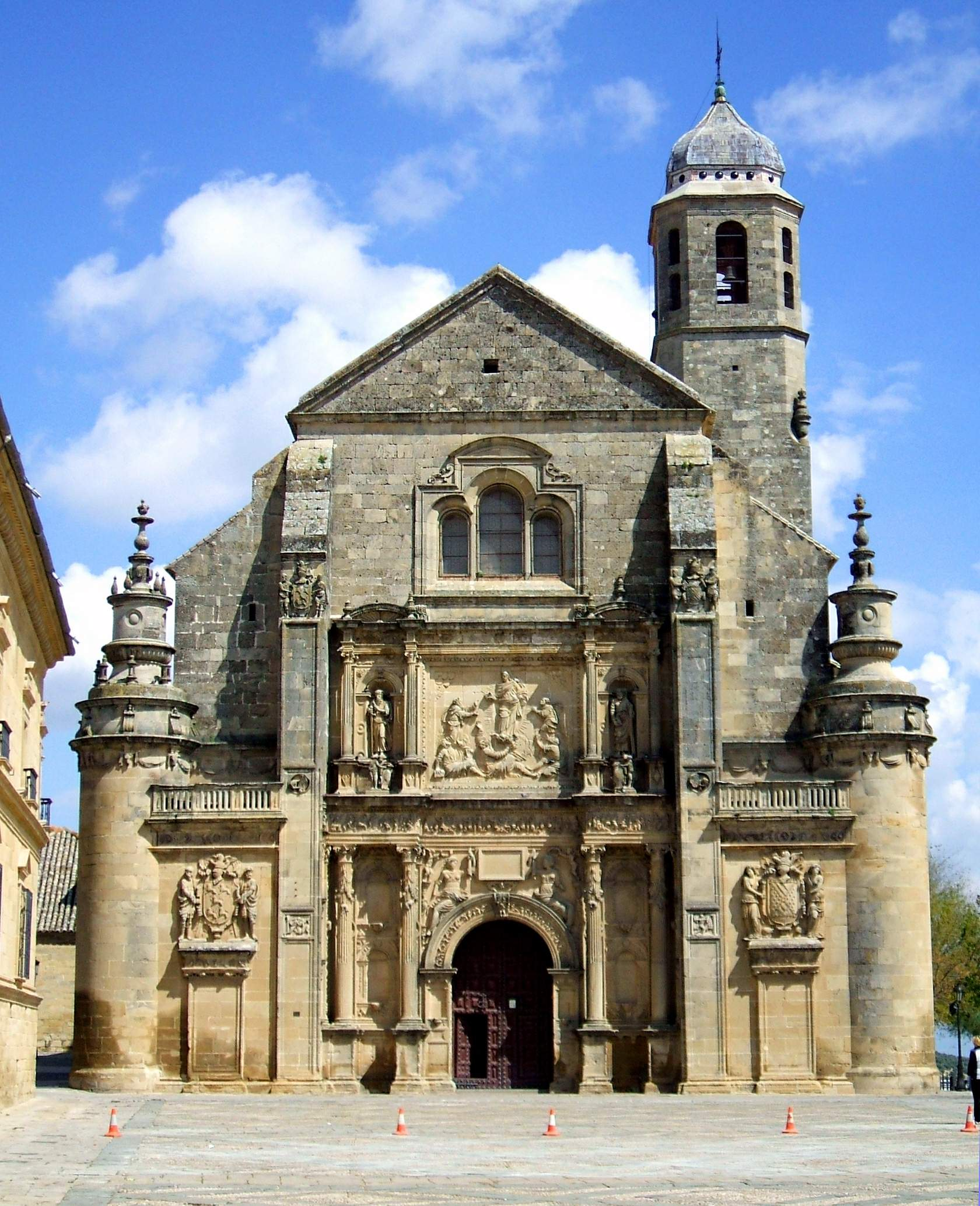
Holy Chapel of the Savior (Úbeda)

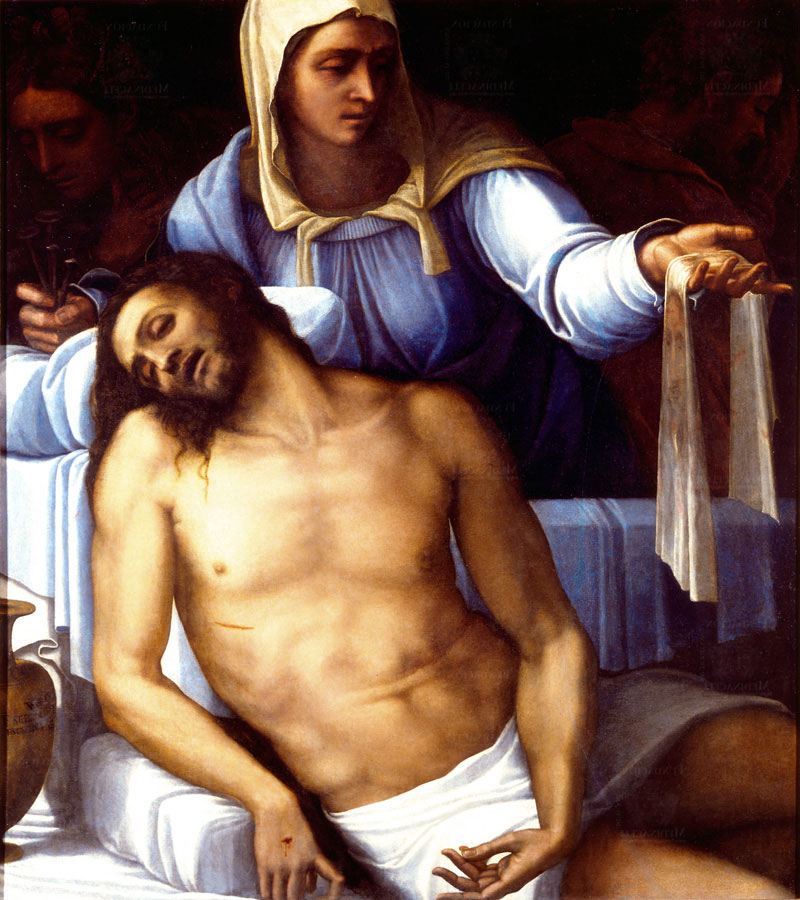
Pietà of Úbeda, by Sebastiano del Piombo

The Holy Chapel of the Savior (Spanish: Sacra Capilla del Salvador) is a church in Úbeda, Spain, built under the patronage of Francisco de los Cobos y Molina as his funeral chapel, attached to his palace and overlooking the Plaza Vázquez de Molina.

== History ==
Commissioned in 1536, it was part of a vast artistic program in Úbeda, intended to enhance the fame, fortune, and personal glory achieved by Francisco de los Cobos y Molina, King Charles I's personal secretary. For this, he employed first-class artists. The initial design was entrusted to Diego de Siloé, while its construction was carried out by Andrés de Vandelvira from 1540. The church was consecrated in 1559. Its first chaplain was Deán Ortega, for whom the large palace to the left of the chapel's main façade was built.

El Salvador was the most ambitious undertaking of all private religious architecture of the Spanish Renaissance. Declared a historic-artistic monument in 1931, it has become one of the most publicized symbols of this city, whose Renaissance monuments, along with those of Baeza, were declared a World Heritage Site by UNESCO in 2003.

The church housed a repertoire of sculptures, relics, jewels, and paintings, pieces of great value acquired or donated to its founder, such as the famous Pietà of Úbeda by Sebastiano del Piombo, moved to the Casa de Pilatos in Seville in 1940 and currently on loan to the Prado Museum in Madrid.
