= Vázquez de Molina Palace =

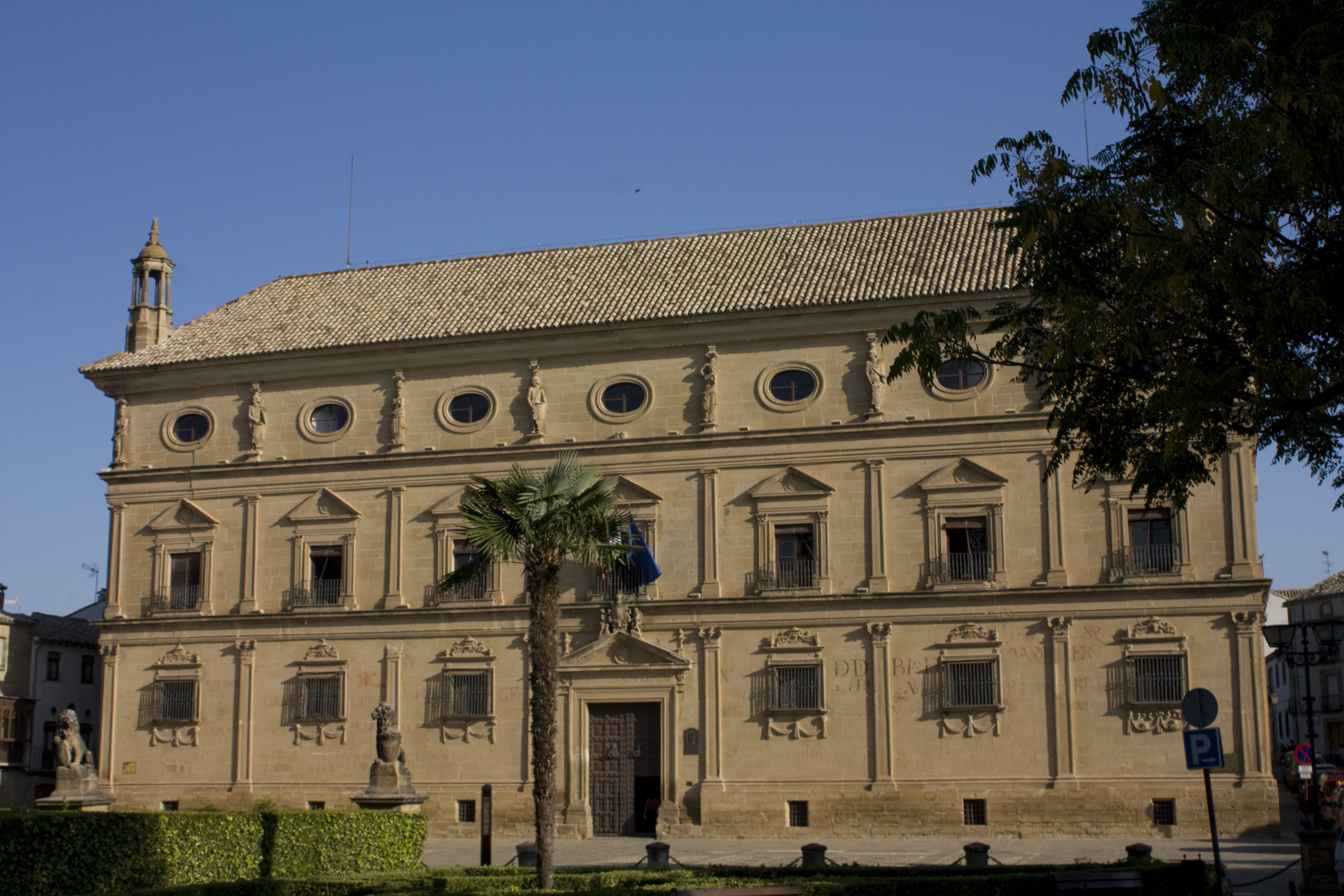
- Main façade
- Interactive map of the Vázquez de Molina Palace area
- Former names: Palace of the Chaims

General information
- Type: Palace
- Architectural style: Renaissance
- Location: Úbeda, Spain
- Coordinates: 38°0′28.93″N 3°22′6.48″W
- Current tenants: Town council
- Construction started: 1546
- Completed: 1565
- Client: Juan Vázquez de Molina

Design and construction
- Architect: Andrés de Vandelvira

The Vazquez de Molina Palace, also known as the Palace of the Chains, is a renaissance palace located in Vazquez de Molina Square in Úbeda (Jaén). It is considered to be one of the best examples of the Renaissance architecture in Spain.

== History ==
The palace was commissioned by Juan Vázquez de Molina, nephew of Francisco de los Cobos, and secretary of State for Philip II. The project was given to Andrés de Vandelvira, who built it between 1546 and 1565.

After the death of the owner the palace became a convent of Dominican nuns, and was remodeled to accommodate the religious community. The mural paintings in the former chapter house can still be seen.

In 1837, after the Ecclesiastical Confiscations of Mendizábal, the building became the City hall.

== Architecture ==
The palace was designed as a quadrilateral with a two-storey courtyard. The façade has three storeys and is divided into seven vertical sections of different widths.

Architectural features of the main facade include the central portal, the triangular pediments that cap the windows of the main floor, the oval bull's-eye windows (porthole) and caryatids of the second floor, the projecting cornice and the lanterns placed at the corners of the roof.

== Sources ==
- Bertrand Jestaz (1995). The art of the Renaissance. Abrams. ISBN 0810919486.
- José Camón Aznar (1973). Arquitectura y orfebrería españolas del siglo XVI. Espasa-Calpe. ISBN 978-84-239-5217-5.
