= Church of la Santísima Trinidad (Alcaraz) =

- Iglesia de la Santísima Trinidad (Spanish)
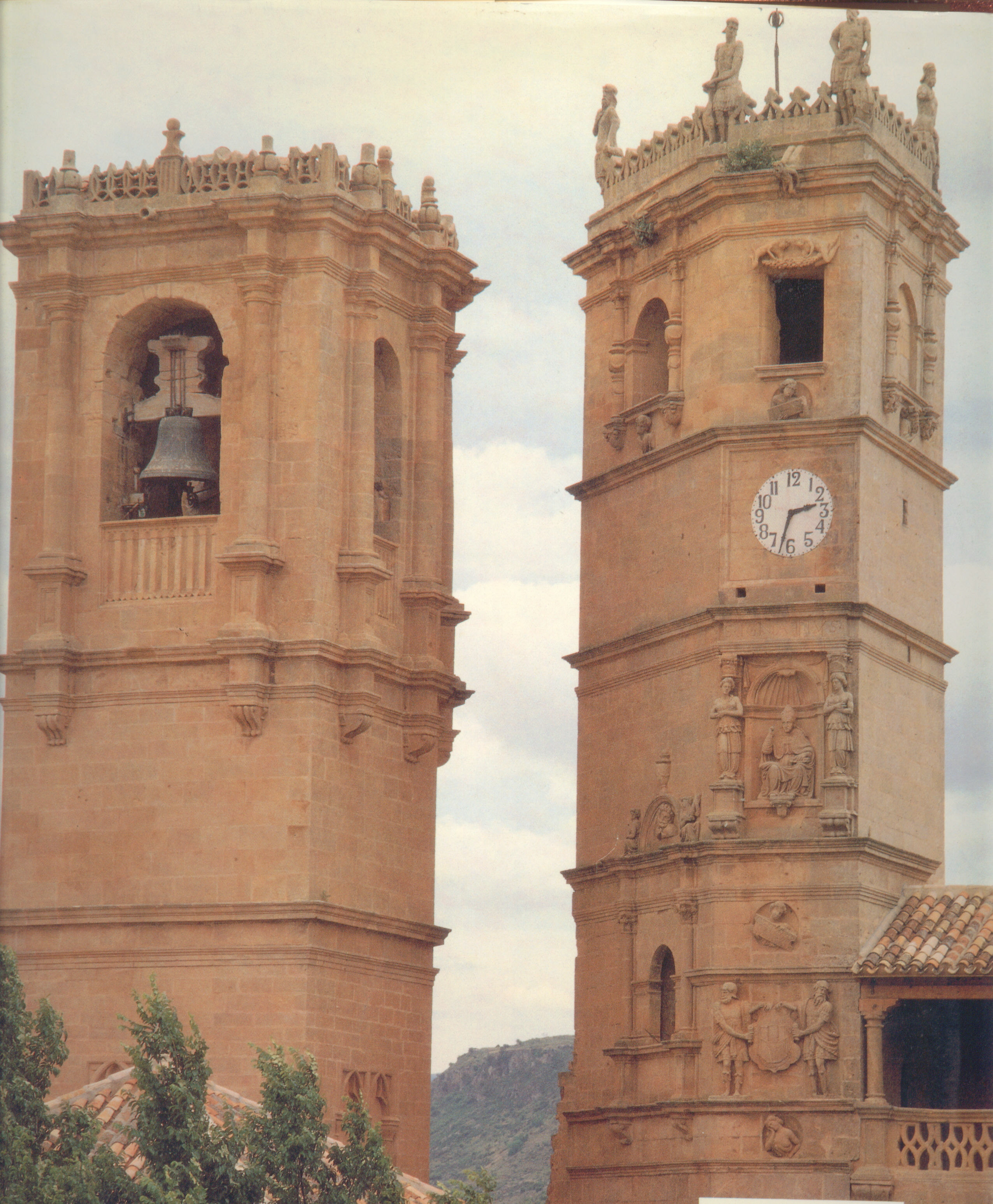
- Church (left) and city hall (right) towers

- Location within Spain
- 38.664641°N 2.490427°W
- Location: Alcaraz, Spain

Spanish Cultural Heritage
- Official name: Iglesia de la Santísima Trinidad
- Type: Non-movable
- Criteria: Monument
- Designated: 1982
- Reference no.: RI-51-0004658

The Church of la Santísima Trinidad (Spanish: Iglesia de la Santísima Trinidad) is a Roman Catholic church located in Alcaraz, Spain. It was declared Bien de Interés Cultural in 1982.

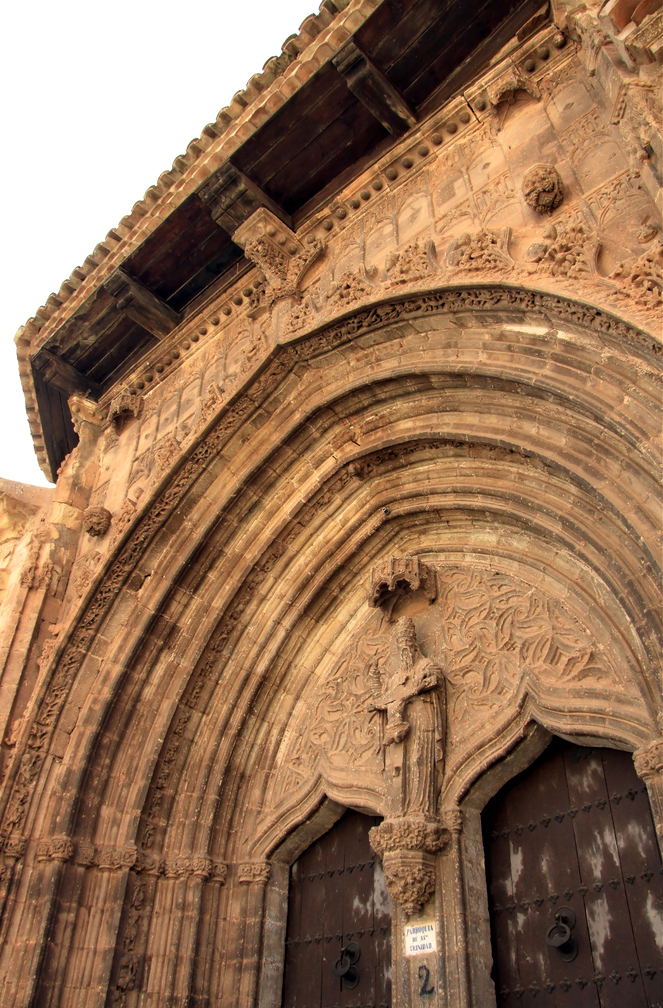
Gothic main portal of the church

The church is located in the Plaza del Cementerio next to the Plaza mayor and the Torres de la Trinidad of city hall. Construction began in the 14th century, and it has a Gothic main portal. However the interiors were refurbished over the centuries. The chapel of Don Pedro Primero el Grande, is attributed to Andrés de Vandelvira and the Chapel of St Sebastian is attributed to his followers.

== See also ==
- 16th-century Western domes
