= Juan Vázquez de Molina =

Juan Vázquez de Molina (Úbeda, between 1500–1510 – Úbeda, 28 June 1570) was a Spanish administrator and politician of the 16th century.

== Biography ==
He entered the imperial administration and was promoted very quickly through his mother's cousin, Francisco de los Cobos, the Secretary of State of King Charles I. During the regency of Empress Isabella in Spain, Juan Vázquez de Molina served as her Secretary (1529) and between 1535 and 1538 as Secretary for Castilian Affairs.

Upon the death of his mother's cousin, Francisco de los Cobos in 1547, he succeeded him as head of the imperial bureaucracy. Vázquez de Molina thus became the most important figure at court, until the return of Philip II to Spain in 1559.

By then, his nephew, Juan Vázquez de Salazar (1530–1597), was already well-positioned at Court and succeeded him as Secretary of War. This confirmed the court patronage system established by Cobos, a clear example of the bureaucratic inbreeding of the time, very common among secretaries.

In 1567, the King granted Juan Vázquez de Molina permission to leave Court and retire to Úbeda due to his recurring illnesses, and he settled in his hometown on 8 December. For the last 3 years of his life, he enjoyed the properties he had accumulated there. He lived in the Palacio de las Cadenas, one of the finest works of Renaissance architect Andrés de Vandelvira, which had already been completed around 1563.

Juan Vázquez de Molina married twice, but had no children.
He died on 28 June 1570. His remains rest in the main chapel of the Palacio de las Cadenas, which became a Monastery.
His nephew, Juan Vázquez de Salazar, secretary to Philip II since 26 March 1561 and Lord of El Mármol, inherited the majority of his property and privileges.
