= Andrés de Vandelvira =

Spanish architect

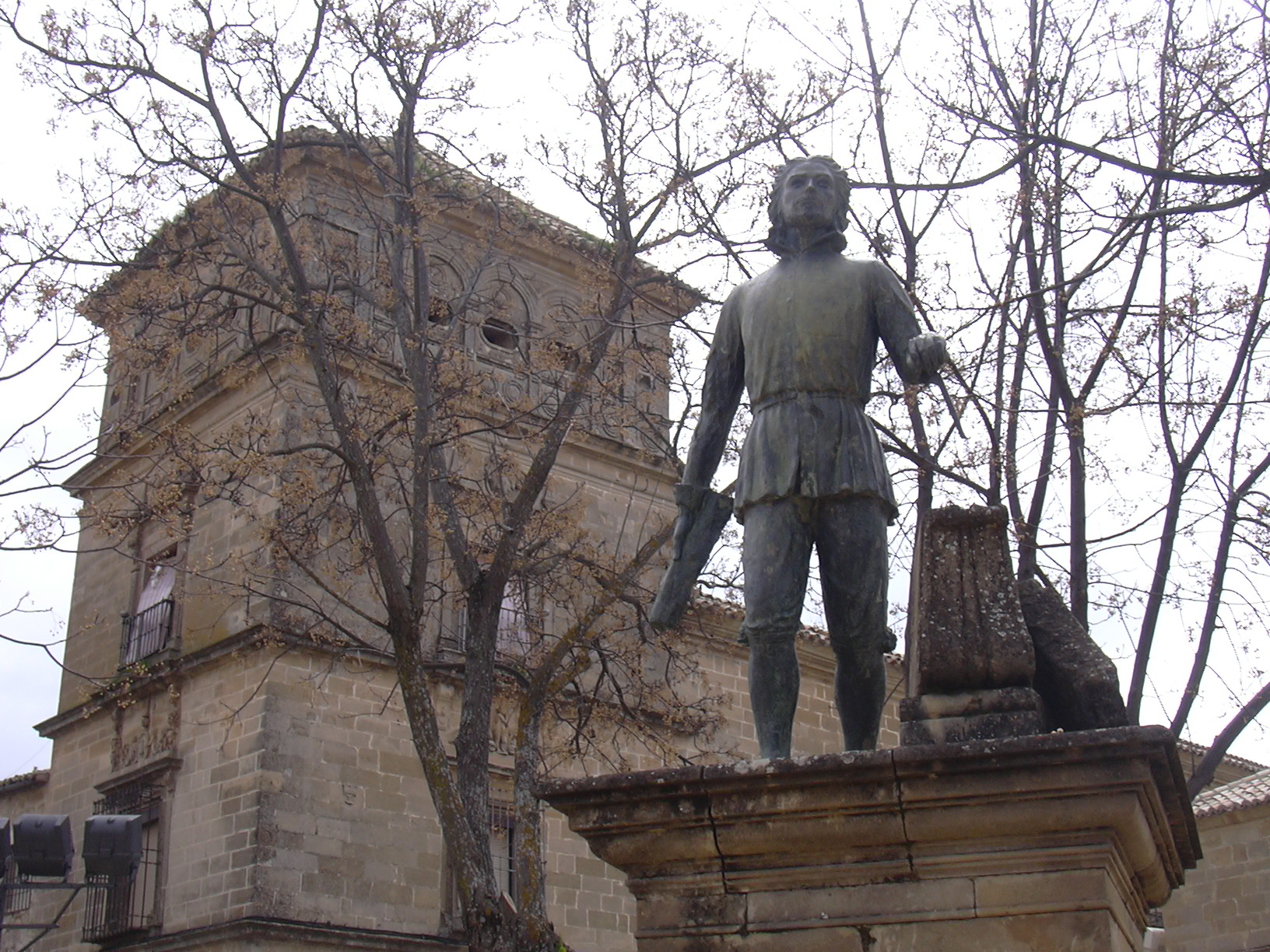
- Andrés de Vandelvira, monument in Vázquez de Molina Square in Úbeda in front of his building Hospital de Santiago
- Born: 1509; Alcaraz, Kingdom of Toledo, Crown of Castile
- Died: 1575 (aged 65–66); Jaén, Kingdom of Jaén, Crown of Castile
- Occupation: Architect
- Movement: Spanish Renaissance
- Children: Alonso de Vandelvira
- Buildings: Convent of Santa María Magdalena de la Cruz

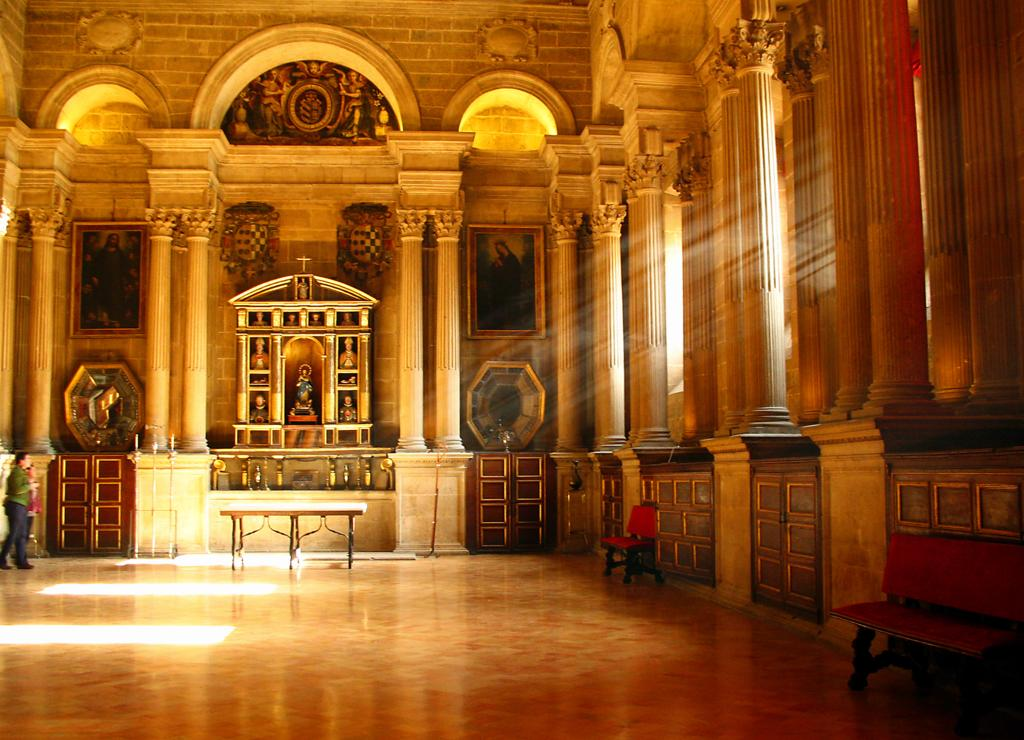
Sacristy. Jaén cathedral

Andrés de Vandelvira (1509–1575) was a Spanish architect, active mainly in Jaén, Uclés, Baeza, and Úbeda during the Renaissance. He was born in Alcaraz, in the province of Albacete and died in Jaén.

The church of Nuestra Señora de la Asunción in Villacarrillo was one of his first works in Jaén.
Among his most notable works is the Holy Chapel of the Savior in Úbeda, based on a project by Diego de Siloé, and commissioned by Francisco de los Cobos. The Chapel is located on the Vazquez de Molina Square next to the Dean Ortega Palace and the Vázquez de Molina Palace, both designed by Vandelvira, and commissioned by Fernando Ortega Salido and Juan Vázquez de Molina respectively.

He completed the Chapel of the Benavides in the convent of San Francisco of Baeza. He also helped complete Baeza Cathedral, the Convent of Santo Domingo, La Guardia de Jaén, and the Hospital de Santiago in Úbeda. His masterpiece is considered to be Jaén Cathedral.

One of his sons, Alonso de Vandelvira, published a book on stone-cutting, entitled "Libro de cortes de piedra", in which he disseminated the mountaineering technique or stereotomy, which deals with constructive planning in three dimensions, and which helped to make known in Europe, the extraordinary scientific work of his father

== See also ==
- Church of la Santísima Trinidad (Alcaraz)
