= Palacio del Deán Ortega, Úbeda =

Coordinates: 38.0081°N 3.3696°W

Palacio del Deán Ortega
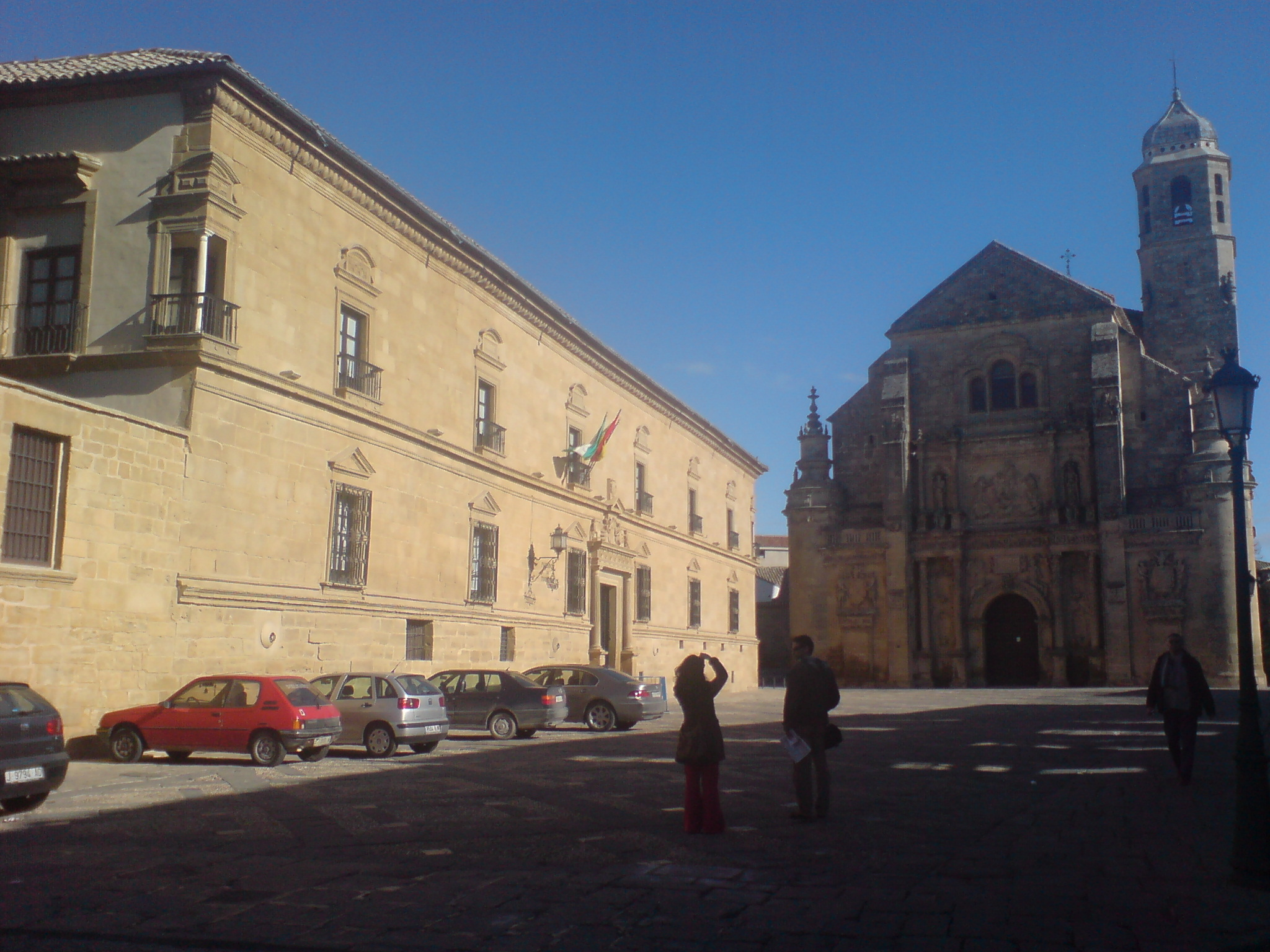
- Interactive map of Palacio del Deán Ortega
- Alternative names: Parador de Úbeda
- Hotel chain: Paradores

General information
- Location: Úbeda (Jaén), Spain

Website
- Parador de Úbeda

Palacio del Deán Ortega ,also known as the Palace of the Marquis of Donadío, is one of the most important Renaissance palaces in Úbeda, in the Province of Jaén, Spain.

== History ==
It was built in the mid-16th century by Andrés de Vandelvira, and was commissioned by Fernando Ortega Salido, Dean of Málaga Cathedral (hence the palace's name). It has been a Parador (a state-run luxury hotel) since 1929. In 2003 it was declared a Bien de Interés Cultural site.
