= Spanish Renaissance architecture =

Style of architecture

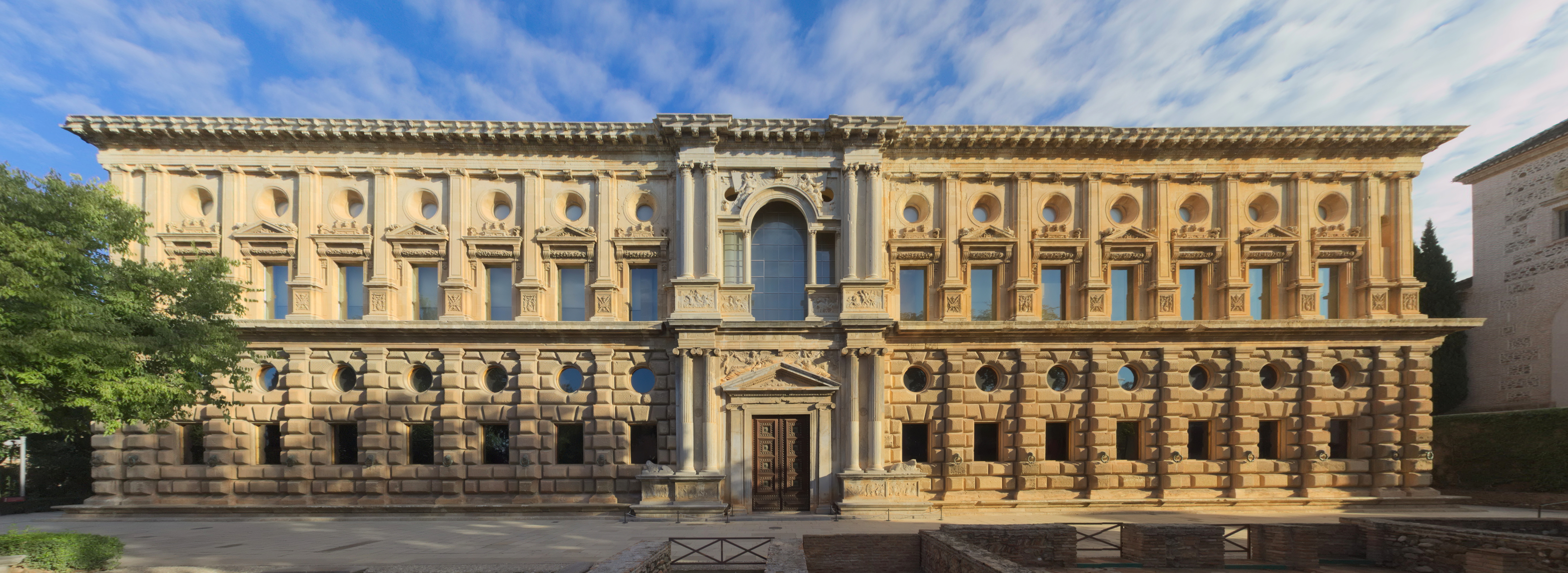
South facade of the Palace of Charles V

Spanish Renaissance architecture emerged in the late 15th century as Renaissance ideals reached Spain, blending with existing Gothic forms. Rooted in Renaissance humanism and a renewed interest in Classical architecture, the style became distinguished by a synthesis of Gothic and Italian Renaissance elements. The style is a creation of uniquely Spanish phases notable because of both rich ornamentation and restrained minimalism. The period saw contributions from the patronage of noble families, notably the House of Mendoza, and architects like Lorenzo Vázquez de Segovia, whose works in places like the Colegio Mayor Santa Cruz in Valladolid, incorporated Tuscan-Roman motifs alongside Gothic forms.

In the northern regions, Italian influences expanded, while local architectural styles (or schools) combined French, Flemish and Lombard styles in highly ornamental designs, seen in landmarks such as the façade of the Universidad de Salamanca. The distinctive Plateresque style also emerged, with decorative forms mimicking silversmith techniques. Meanwhile, the integration of Islamic decorative methods with Gothic structures developed into the Mudéjar style, particularly in Andalusia, Aragón, and Castile.

During the reign of Philip II of Spain (r. 1556–1589), Renaissance influence spread across Spain, aided by architecture treatises from famous architects, including Vitruvius, Leon Battista Alberti, Sebastiano Serlio, Andrea Palladio, Giacomo Barozzi da Vignola and Diego de Sagredo, among others. Spanish Renaissance architecture thus became defined by an eclectic fusion of local and imported influences, shaping an architectural identity that resonated across the Iberian Peninsula.

== Brief history (c. 1500–1600) ==
Between 1500 and 1600, Spain experienced an architectural transition from the Gothic style to Renaissance one. The style was characterized by two distinct phases: the first with elements of excessive ornamentation and then the second, characterized by a more severe minimalism. Despite a general consensus on these phases, there has been little consistency in terminology, Spanish Renaissance architecture does not follow a single, unified style or cohesive development and is ultimately characterized by a variety of styles. The style comprises a mix of influences, with elements from both Gothic and Plateresque styles continuing into the 16th century.

== Characteristics ==
=== Mudéjar style ===
From the 12th to the 16th centuries, the Mudéjar style flourished, primarily in Castile, Aragón, and Andalusia. Derived from the term mudajjan, meaning "domesticated" or "subjugated", Mudéjar describes an artistic style resulting from a unique demographic situation born of the Reconquest. This style is viewed as a synthesis of Romanesque, Baroque, Gothic and Renaissance elements. This was seen in the preservation of aspects found in Islamic artistry after Christian rulers reconquered former Muslim-controlled lands in Spain. This Mudéjar style utilized Arabic forms and techniques, influenced by Christian ecclesiastical architecture, and evolved from Romanesque Mudéjar to Gothic Mudéjar over time. By the mid-13th century, Gothic Mudéjar incorporated Gothic-inspired plans mixed with Islamic decorative motifs, seen in buildings such as the Synagogue of Santa María la Blanca, Synagogue of El Tránsito and San Tomé. Bishops and Christian nobles embraced these Islamic motifs, integrating them into palaces and church treasuries, a symbolic yet functional coalescence of two cultures.

In Aragón, Mudéjar elements adorned both the interiors and exteriors of buildings, as seen in the Cathedral of the Savior of Zaragoza, La Seo de Zaragoza, particularity notable in their polygonal towers. In Andalusia, Mudéjar features were most visible in coffered ceilings and cloister vaults set on squinch arches. These features reflected not only architectural ingenuity, but also the interwoven social fabric as various cultural practices, including marriage traditions, clothing, and everyday economies that continued to bridge communities even amid political shifts. This architectural synthesis culminated in a Spanish style that endured, making the ongoing integration of Islamic designs in non-Muslim contexts and the social unity maintained despite territorial changes.

=== Italian influence ===
In the late 15th century, Proto-Renaissance architecture in Spain began to reflect Italian influences, primarily through decorative elements brought by the Mendoza family's patronage. Architect Lorenzo Vázquez of Segovia, in service of Cardinal Pedro González de Mendoza, contributed works such as the Colegio de Santa Cruz (1486–1494) and the Palacio Medinaceli (c. 1492–1495). Vázquez's subsequent projects include: the Palace of Antonio de Mendoza in Guadalajara (before 1507), the Monastery of San Antonio de Mondéjar (1489–1509), and the early phase of La Calahorra Castle in Granada (begun in 1492). All of these buildings demonstrate his use of cloister supports, or composite columns, featuring Gothic proportions combined with pseudo-classical pilasters.

Around the same time, the Alcarreña school emerged in the northern peninsula, characterized by a distinctive decorative style that blended French and Flemish influences with Lombard ornamentation. The approach of architects in this style applied embellishments, often prioritizing visual impact over strict accuracy and preciseness. Examples of the Alcarreña style include the portal of Santa Engarcia in Saragossa (c. 1512–1515) by Gil de Morlanes, Casa Desplá and Casa Gralla in Barcelona by Felipe Vigarny, Francisco de Colonia, and Hanequín de Cuéllar. The façade of the Universidad de Salamanca (1519–1525) further demonstrates this decorative experimentation, as it integrates elements into Gothic structures like retable-portals and "fachadas-tapiz" (carpet-façades) that were regarded as modern for Late Gothic Spanish architecture.

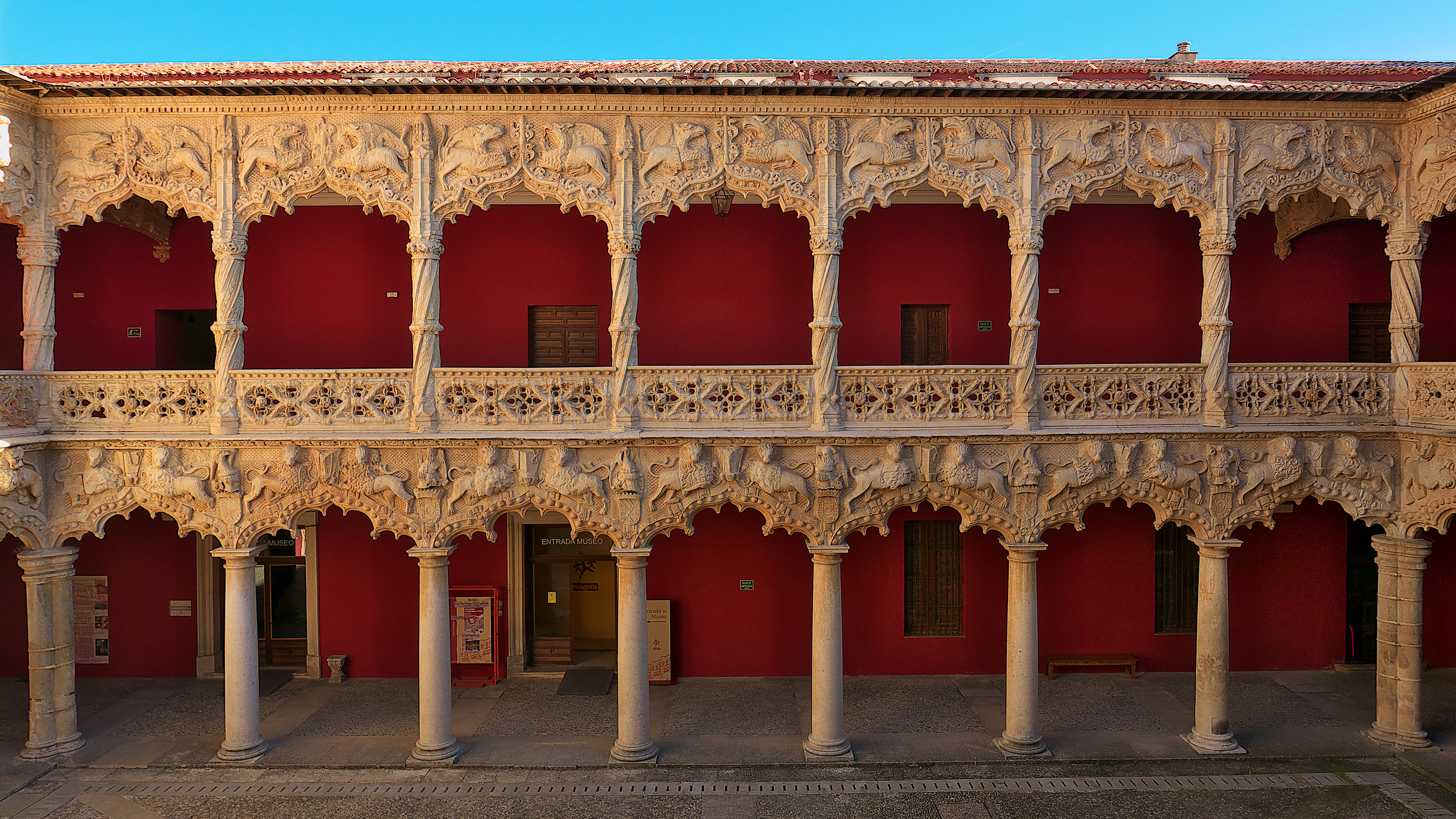
The Palacio del Infantado in Guadalajara

In the 1520s, despite the continuing influence of the Gothic style, a new Italian-inspired approach was emerging in Spain. This design incorporated the use of the classical orders on facades and in interiors, a style previously unseen in Spain. A new approach to decoration was introduced based on Italian architectural elements rather than the typical Plateresque design. Palace interiors adopted Italian styles, incorporating features like vaulting, stucco, and frescoes. One of the best examples of this is at the Palacio del Infantado in Guadalajara, Spain. During this time, a new generation of architects began to emerge, such as Diego de Siloé, who had traveled to Italy and returned to Spain with direct experience of the early sixteenth century architecture from Rome and Naples. Diego de Siloé combined elements, merging domed, centralized structures with longitudinal designs. Along with him, Pedro Machuca, having studied in Italy under Raphael, returned to Spain in 1520 and designed the Palace of Charles V in the Alhambra in Granada. Construction began in 1533 in an attempt to bring the style of a Roman palace into Spain.

==== Geometric perspective ====
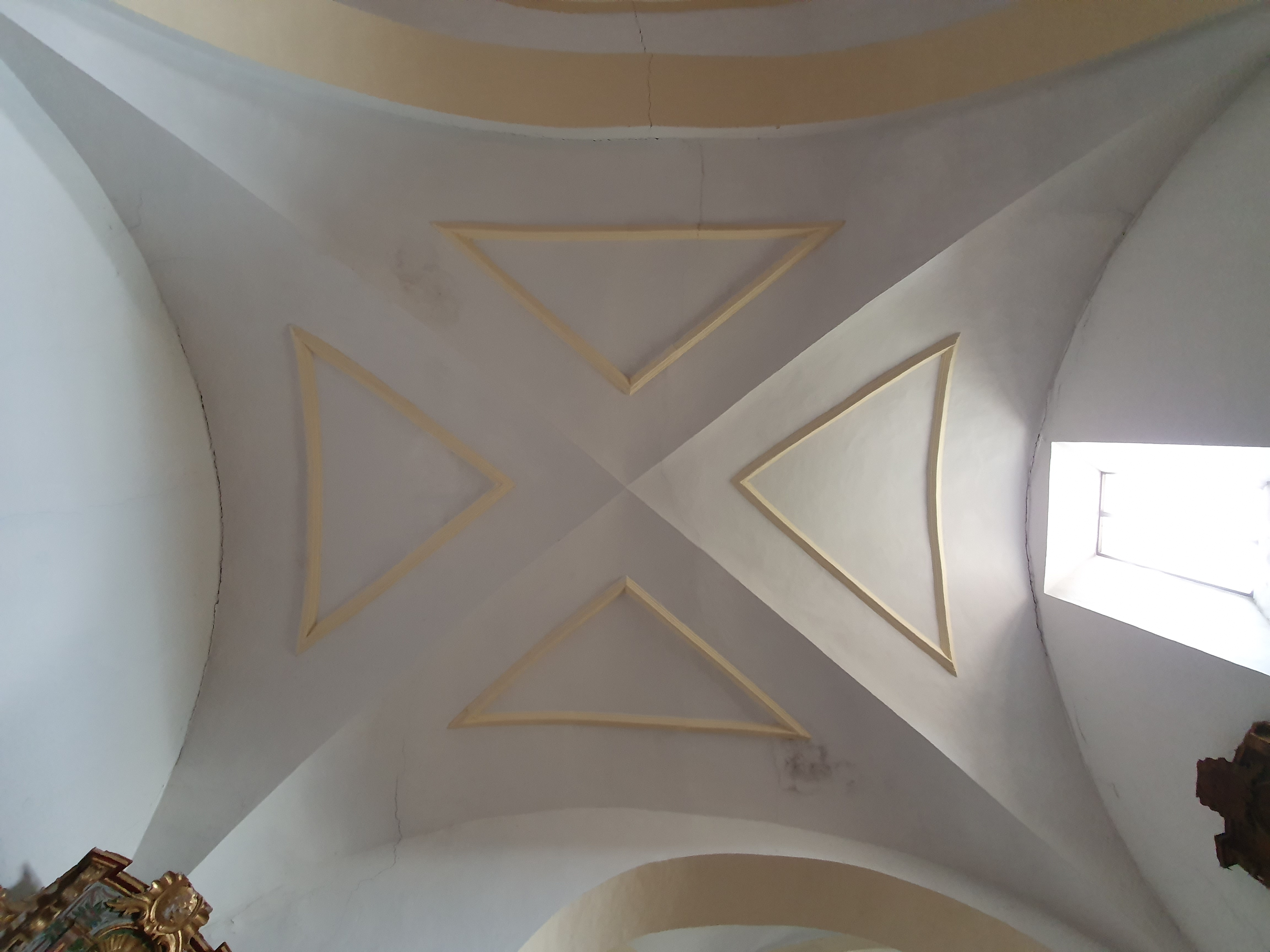
Groin vault in the Church of La Asunción in Almansa

In the Spanish Renaissance style, a relationship between geometry and architecture created a method of architectural reasoning. In the sixteenth century there was a significant transformation of design approaches and construction techniques. The use of geometric perspective made elements like coffered ceilings and groin vaults part of the visual approach to architecture. Both foreign and local innovations led to techniques like timbrel and round barrel vaults. These developments led to the transcription of architectural manuscripts that recorded the mathematic, tectonic, and constructional principles that architects of the Spanish Renaissance were using in their designs.

=== Isabelline style ===
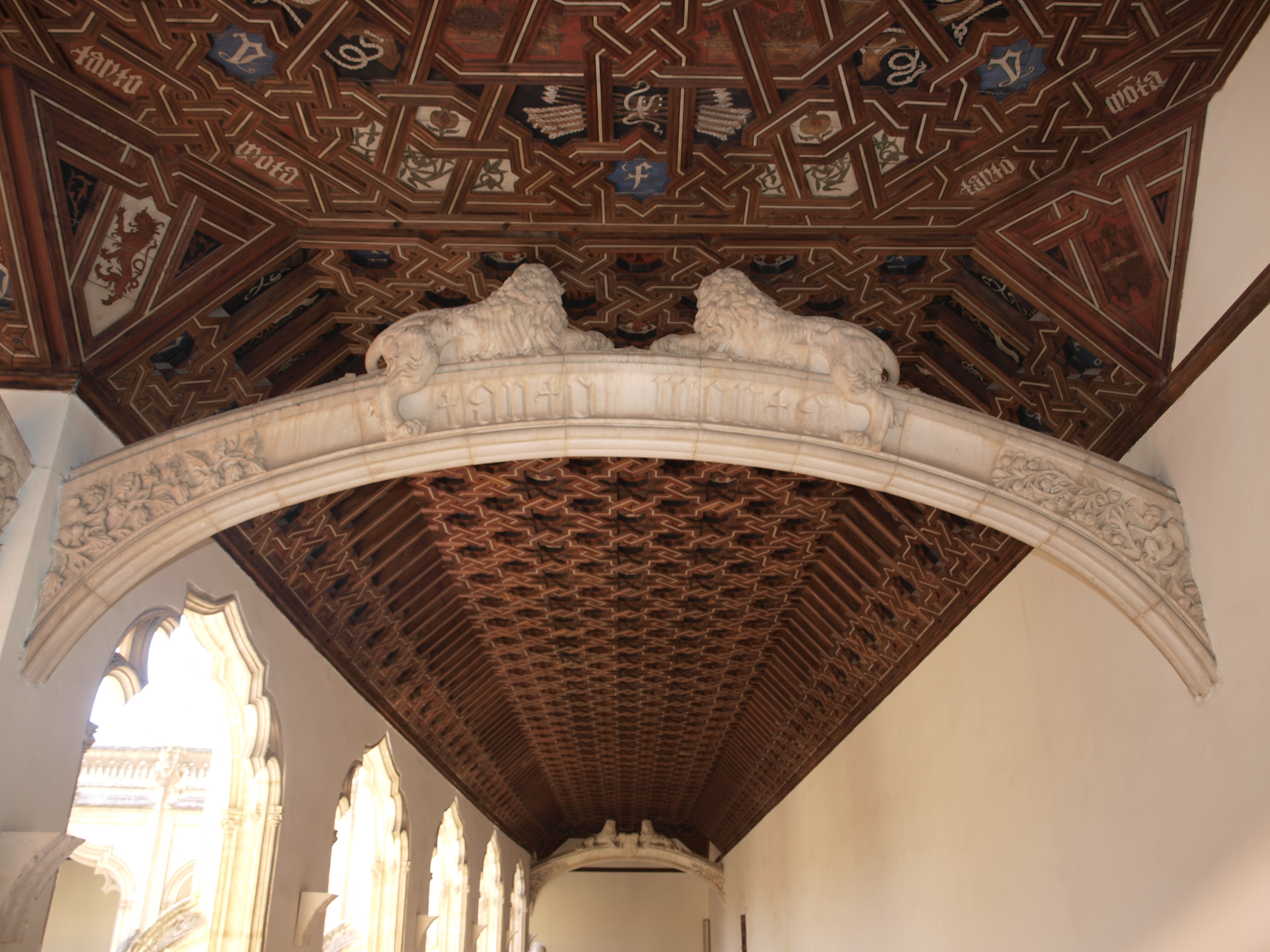
Artesonado ceiling in the Monastery of San Juan De Los Reyes in Toledo

During the Spanish Renaissance, political power was expressed through the form of architecture, specifically, through palaces. Court styles had many practices that shaped the function and design of architecture. For example, Ferdinand and Isabella's court style took features such as heraldic motifs along with Islamic architectural influences from the regions they had reconquered and were now under Spanish rule. Juan Guas (c. 1430–1496) was a prominent Spanish architect for Queen Isabella I of Castile. Along with rich decoration, Juan Guas was known for his ability to blend architectural traditions and techniques from different cultures in the Iberian Peninsula, a technique known as Mudéjar (see above section). The Mudéjar style can be seen in the Monastery San Juan de los Reyes in Toledo, Spain. One technique Juan Guas used was artesonado, a term the denotes wooden ceilings with intricate design derived from North African mixed with and Spanish building techniques that was continued to be used in the fifteenth and sixteenth centuries.

== Plateresque ==
=== Etymology ===
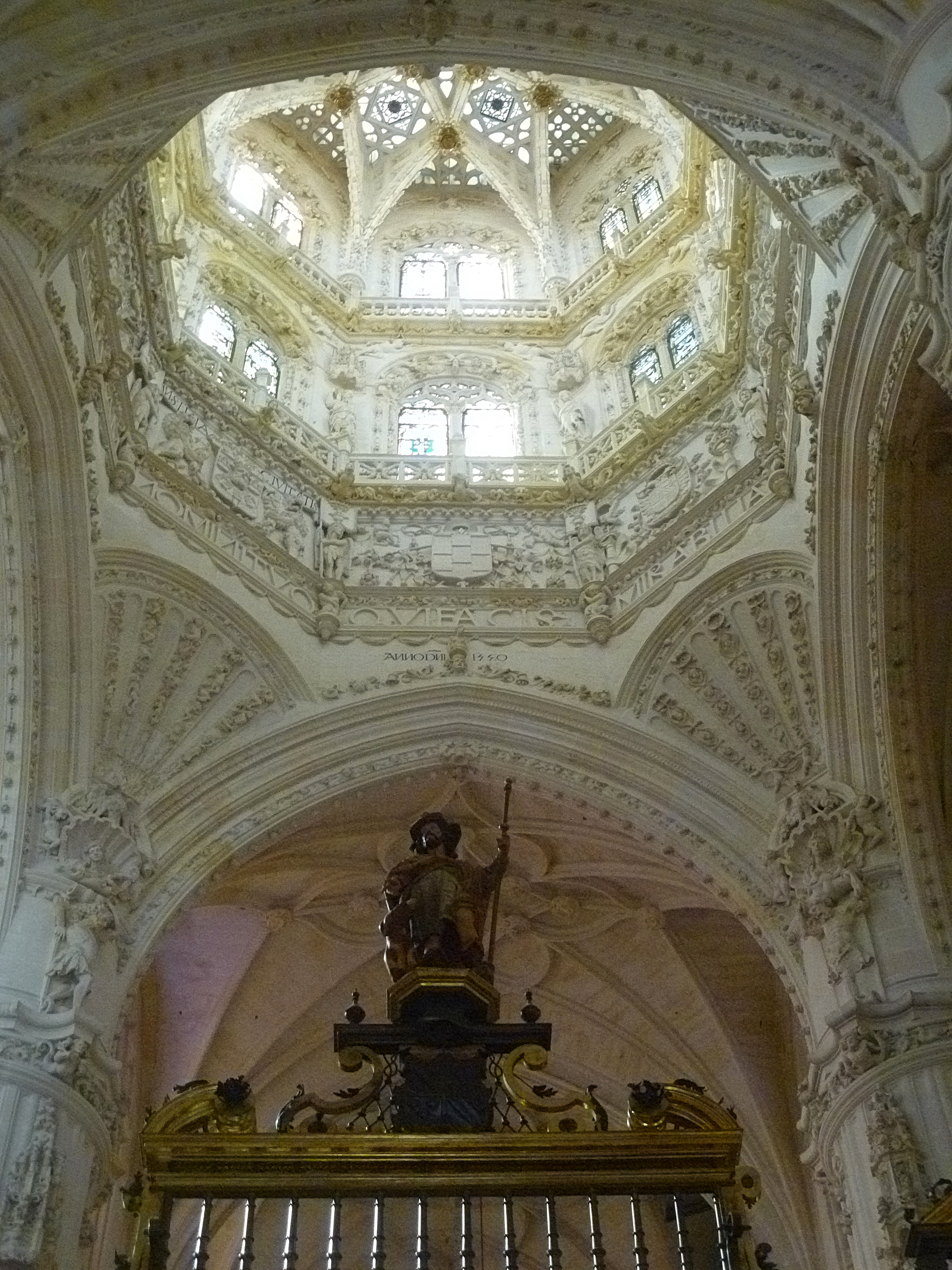
Cathedral of Saint Mary in Burgos

The origin of the term Plateresque remains unknown, though it emerged within early Spanish Renaissance vocabulary to describe the meticulous architectural ornamentation mirroring the work of silversmiths which characterized this period's architectural style. Initially, this new style was solely applied to ornamentation, but later expanded to architectural facades. The style was applied to buildings that had been built during the Muslim occupation of Spain, along with silver, stone, and ivory. The term is first credited to Cristóbal de Villalón in 1539 within his panegyric Comparacíon, where he discussed the Gothic Cathedral of León and likened its ornamental style to the refined craftsmanship of silversmiths. Without using the specific Spanish words platero (silversmith) and plateresco (plateresque), Villalón compared their work to obras de platas (silver works), in which he implied that silversmiths were like "miniature architects" due to the similarities in architectural standards and perfection of expertise in both crafts. In Madrid, craftsmen were known as "plateros deyeso", or plaster silversmiths. The term plateresque also appeared within Lope de Vega's comedy Sembrar en buena tierra, contributing to the confusion surrounding the definitive aspects of the term.

=== Style ===
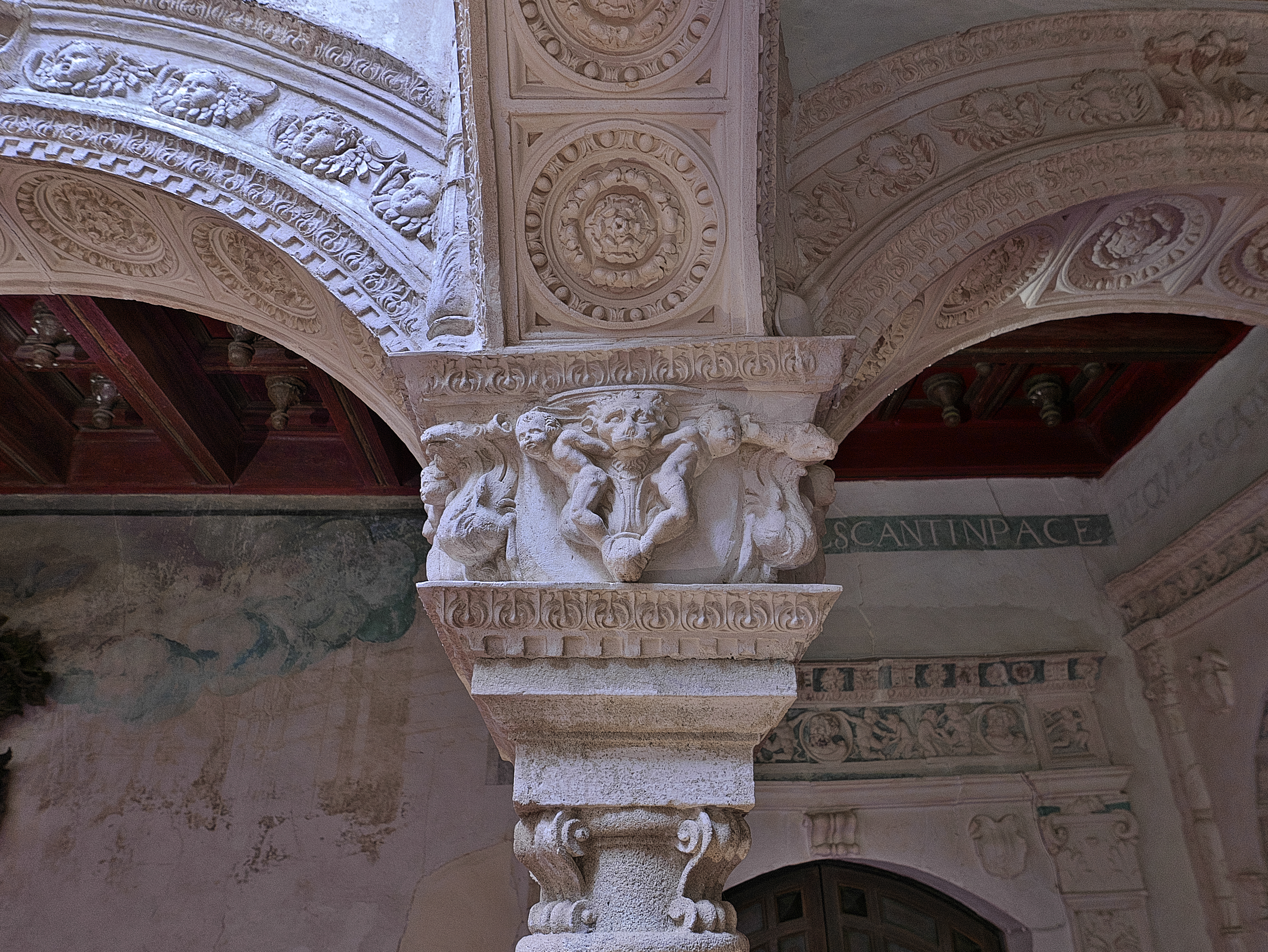
Capital in the Santo Sepulcro courtyard within the Colegiata de Nuestra Señora de la Asunción in Osuna

By the 17th century, the Plateresque style was widely recognized among craftsmen, a statement made by Don Diego Ortiz de Zúñiga (1633–1680). In his 1677 work, Zúñiga used the term to describe the Casa de Ayuntamiento in Madrid, highlighting its exelente dibuxo (excellent drawings), delicadeza (delicacy), and bellísima aparencia (beautiful appearance). The style is also discussed in relation to the Capilla de los Reyes Nuevos, a chapel located in the Seville Cathedral, started by Martín de Gainza, and then later completed by Hernán Ruiz the Younger and Asenio de Maeda in 1575. Their work, deviating from classical Roman standards of ornamentation by allowing greater decorative freedoms, featured "fantasías platerescas" (Plateresque fantasies). This approach corresponds with a definition found in the Spanish Royal Academy's Dictionary of the Castilian language (1726–1739), referring the Plateresque style to a layered ornamental freedom reminiscent of silverwork--a concept possibly influenced by Ortiz's writings.

The Renaissance relationship between metal-smithing and architecture in Spain is also demonstrated in the work of Juan de Arphe y Villafañe, a silversmith working under King Philip III of Spain (r.1598–1621) and Philip IV of Spain (r. 1621–1665).

=== Purism ===
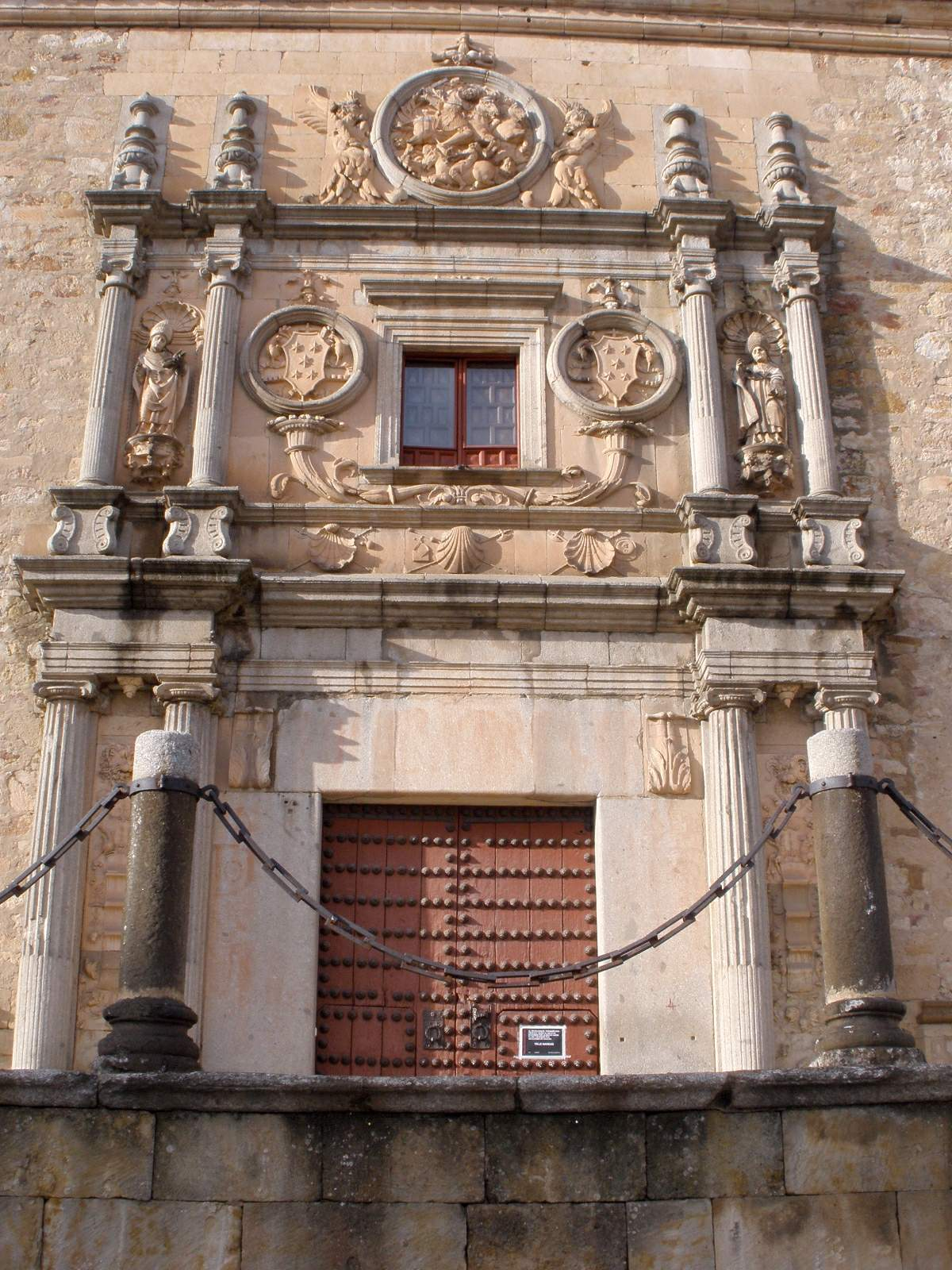
Colegia del Arzobispo Fonseca in Salamanca

In Spain, the elaborate Plateresque and rich Mudéjar was rejected by Purist architecture. Purist architecture favored simplified and classical designs, like the Palace of Charles V in Granada. These designs followed the struct classical principles from Italy, focusing on refinement and seriousness. The style emphasizes individual architectural elements such as entablatures, niches with archivolts, and keystones, rather than an overall decorative scheme. This style relies heavily on classical vocabulary, adhering to principles of "correctness" outlined in classical treaties and the first Renaissance architectural treatise in Spanish by Diego de Sagredo. A notable architect, Rodrigo Gil de Hontañón, served as the Master of Works at several cathedrals including, Segovia, Salamanca, Palencia, Plasencia, and Astorga. He also contributed to renowned projects such as the Colegio del Arzobispo Fonseca, the Palacio de Monterrey in Salamanca, and the Palacio de los Guzmanes in León. Religious architecture after 1550 seamlessly merged Renaissance and Gothic elements in wall-pillar churches. This was achieved by substituting Gothic supports with classical columns and pilasters, notably large-scale Doric, Tuscan, Ionic, and Corinthian designs.

== Herrerian style ==
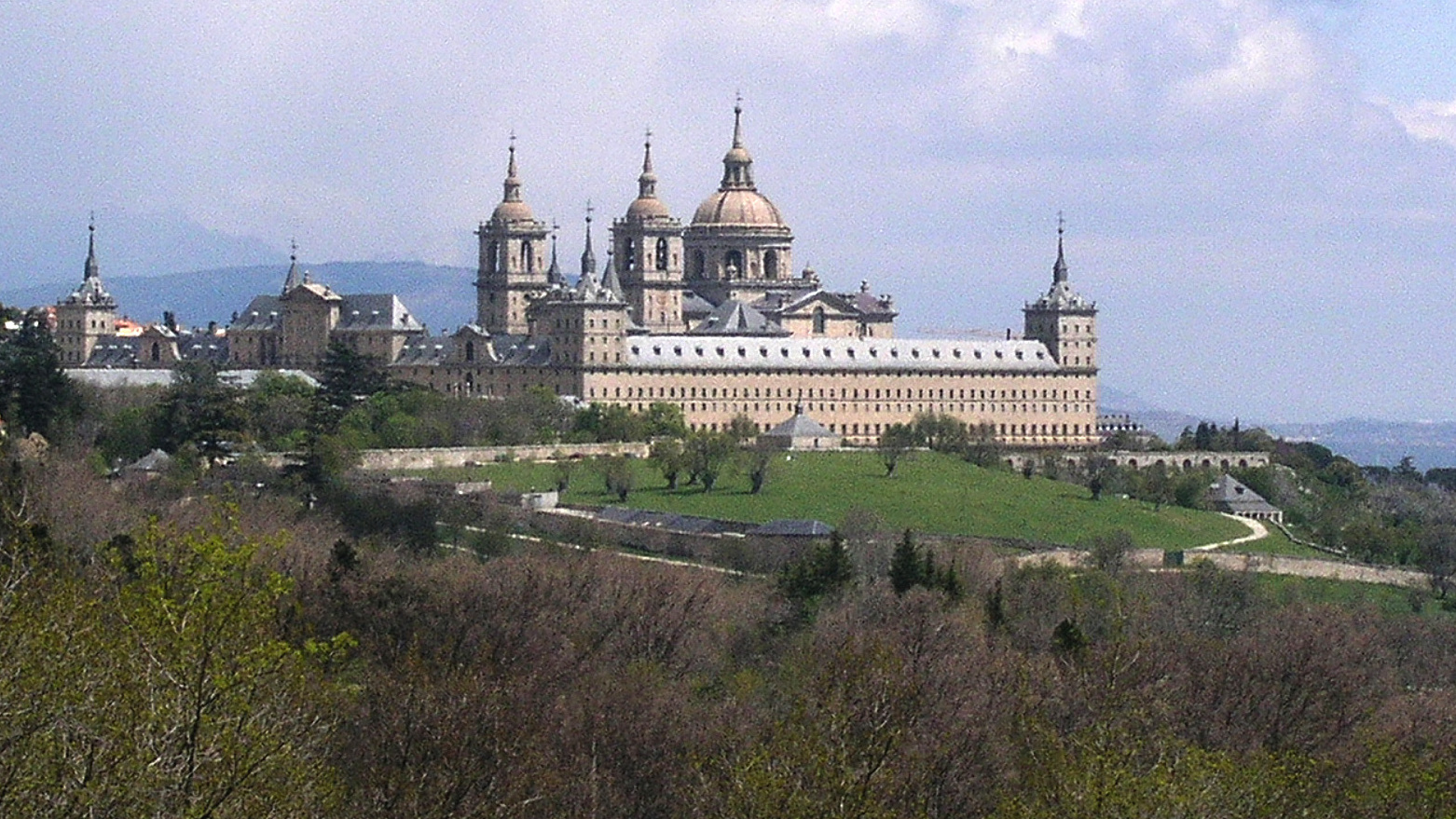
El Escorial, designed for King Phillip II by Juan de Herrera

A final phase of the Spanish Renaissance style emerged with the work of Juan Bautista de Toledo, and Juan de Herrera in the Escorial: the Herrerian style. The Escorial would be the flagship architectural piece of this new style as it spread throughout Spanish institutional buildings and even into new world colonies. The Herrerian style stemmed from a desire to extend the influence of Spain's new Christian monarchy after the reconquista and represent the architecture of government institutions in a more striking way. The Herrerian style can be characterized as extremely sober and naked. Herrerian style is utilitarian and uses a lot of horizontal symmetry. Ornamentation is no longer present; rather Herrerian style architecture relies on its austerity and typically tall facades to alter the urban scales, making the structure's stature feel imposing to whoever walks past it. Herrerian style can also be characterized by frequent use of granite ashlar masonry work. Spanish architects during this time (specifically, the years 1559–1567), differed from the traditional Renaissance model of architecture in two fundamental ways: it associated design and building within a continuum and it assigned responsibility for design entirely to a professional who would remain involved with the building's construction.

== Gallery of Spanish Renaissance Architecture ==
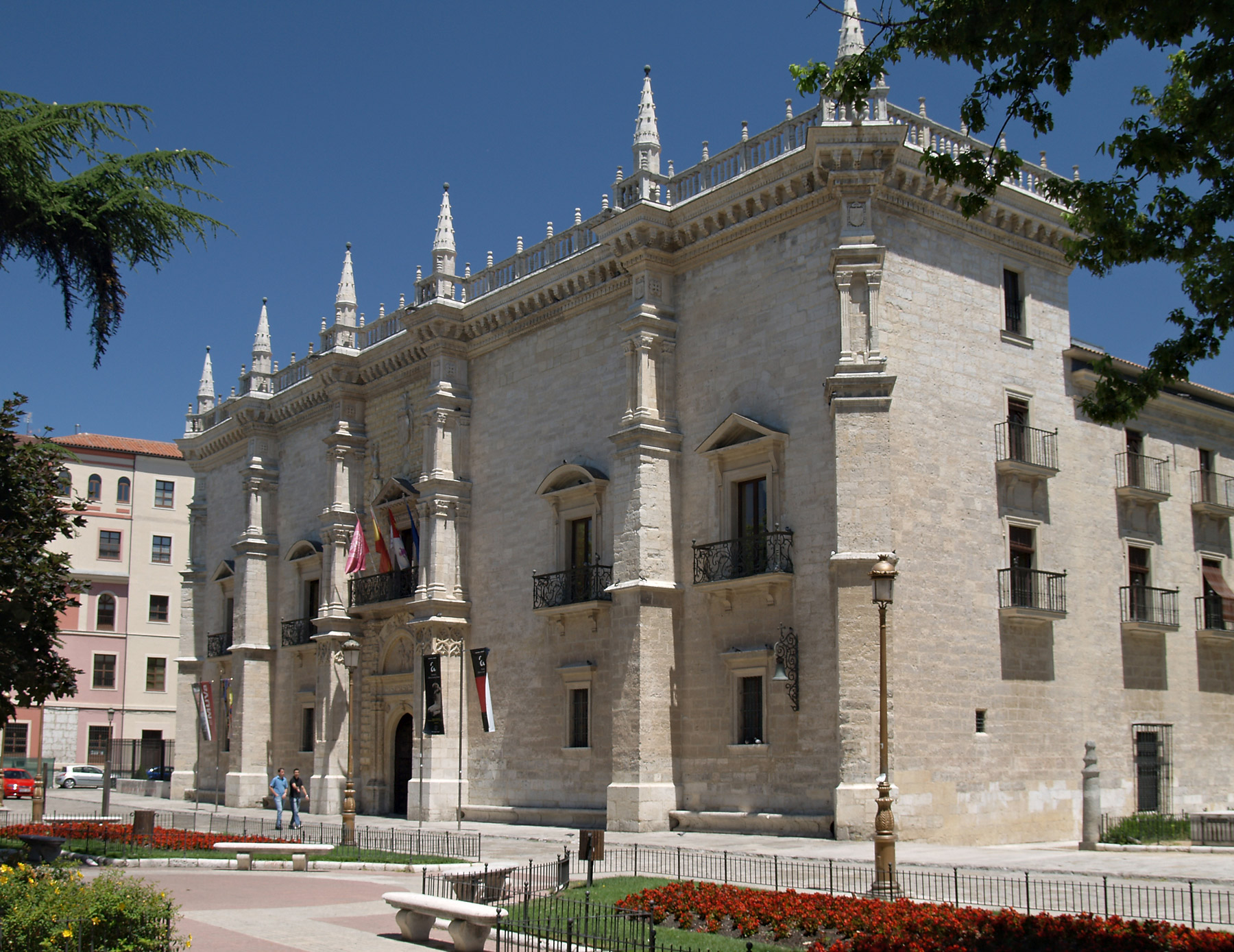
The late-15th century Palacio de Santa Cruz, an early example of Renaissance architecture in Valladolid

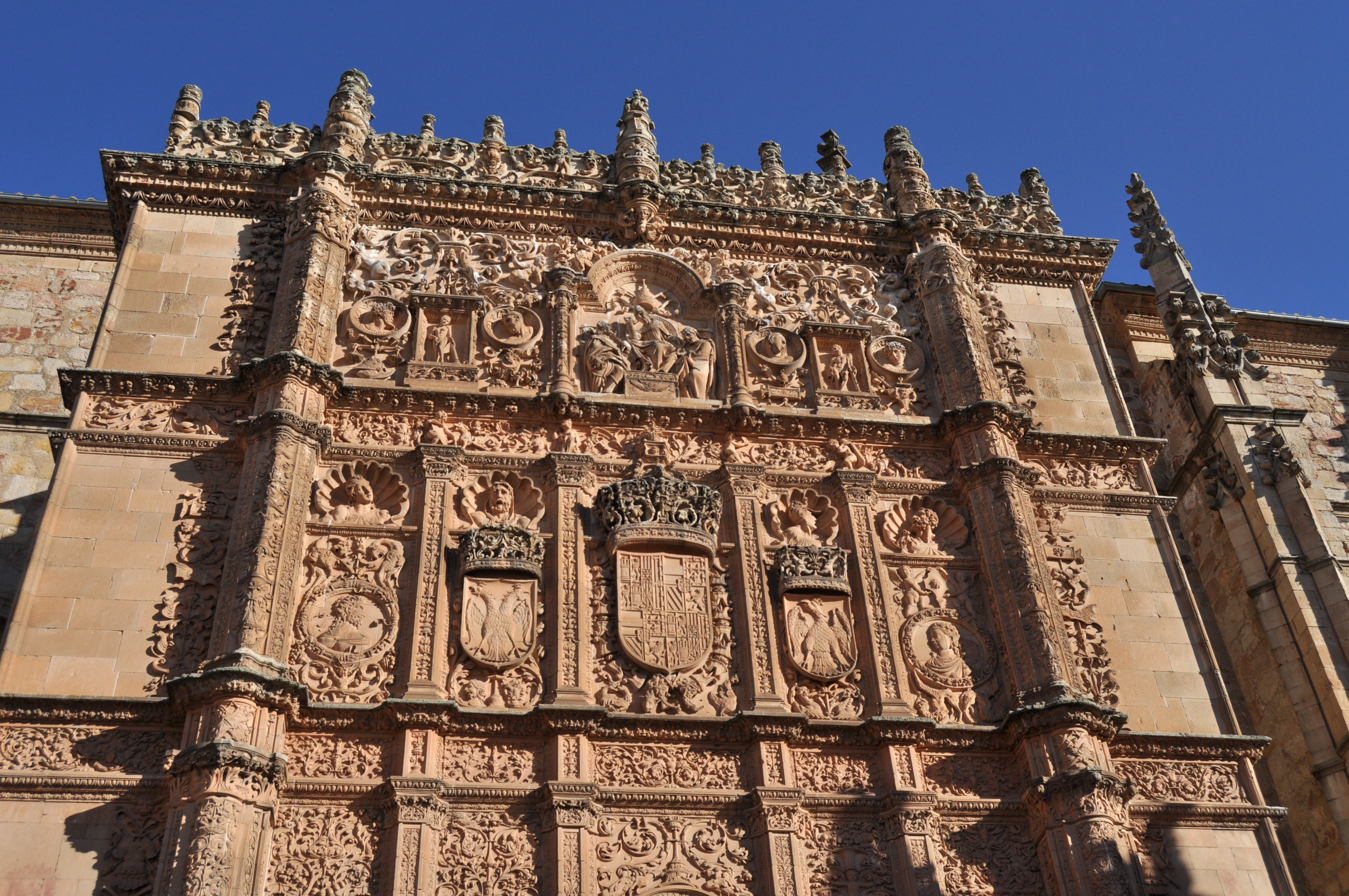
Plateresque facade of the University of Salamanca

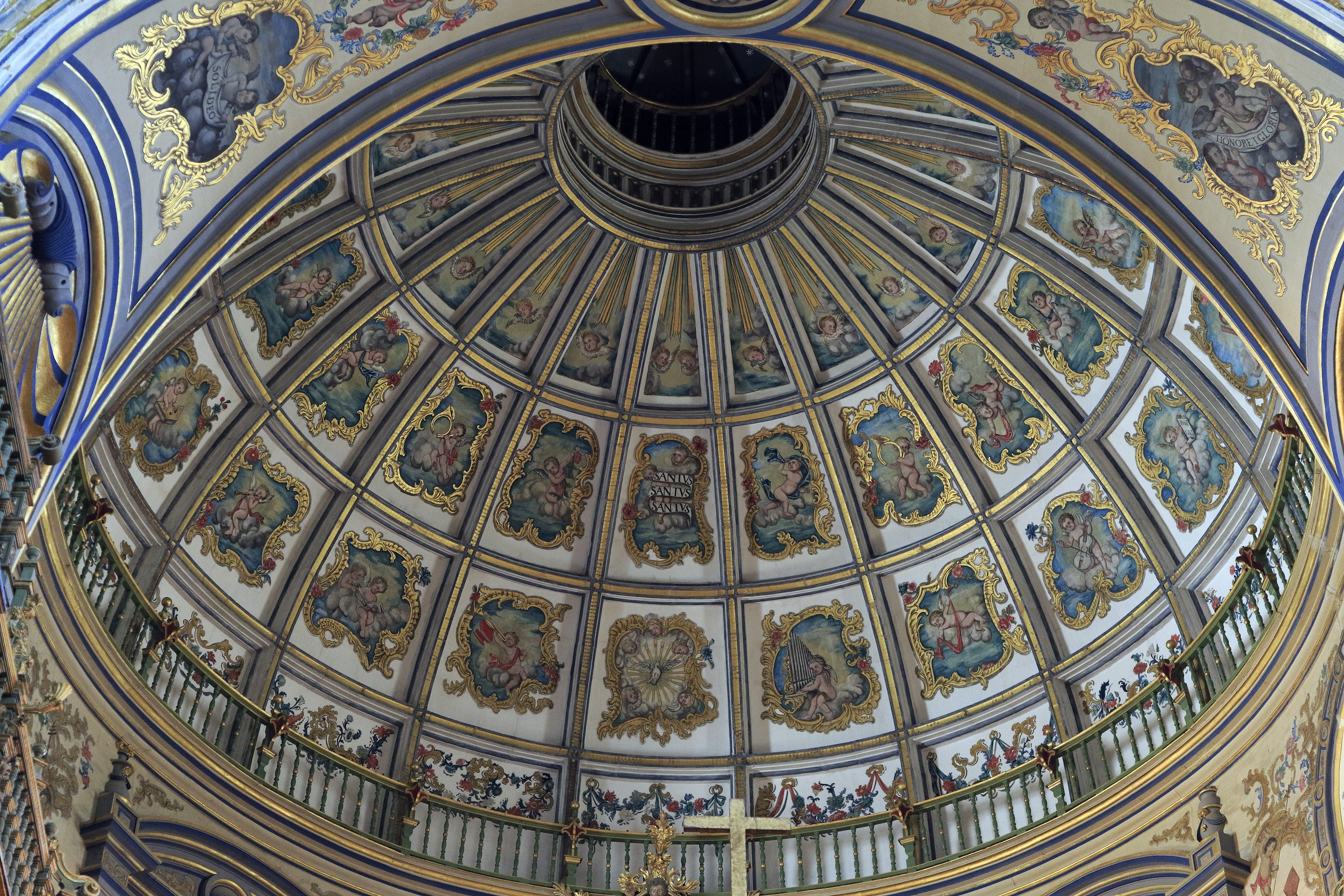
Dome of the Chapel of El Salvador in Úbeda

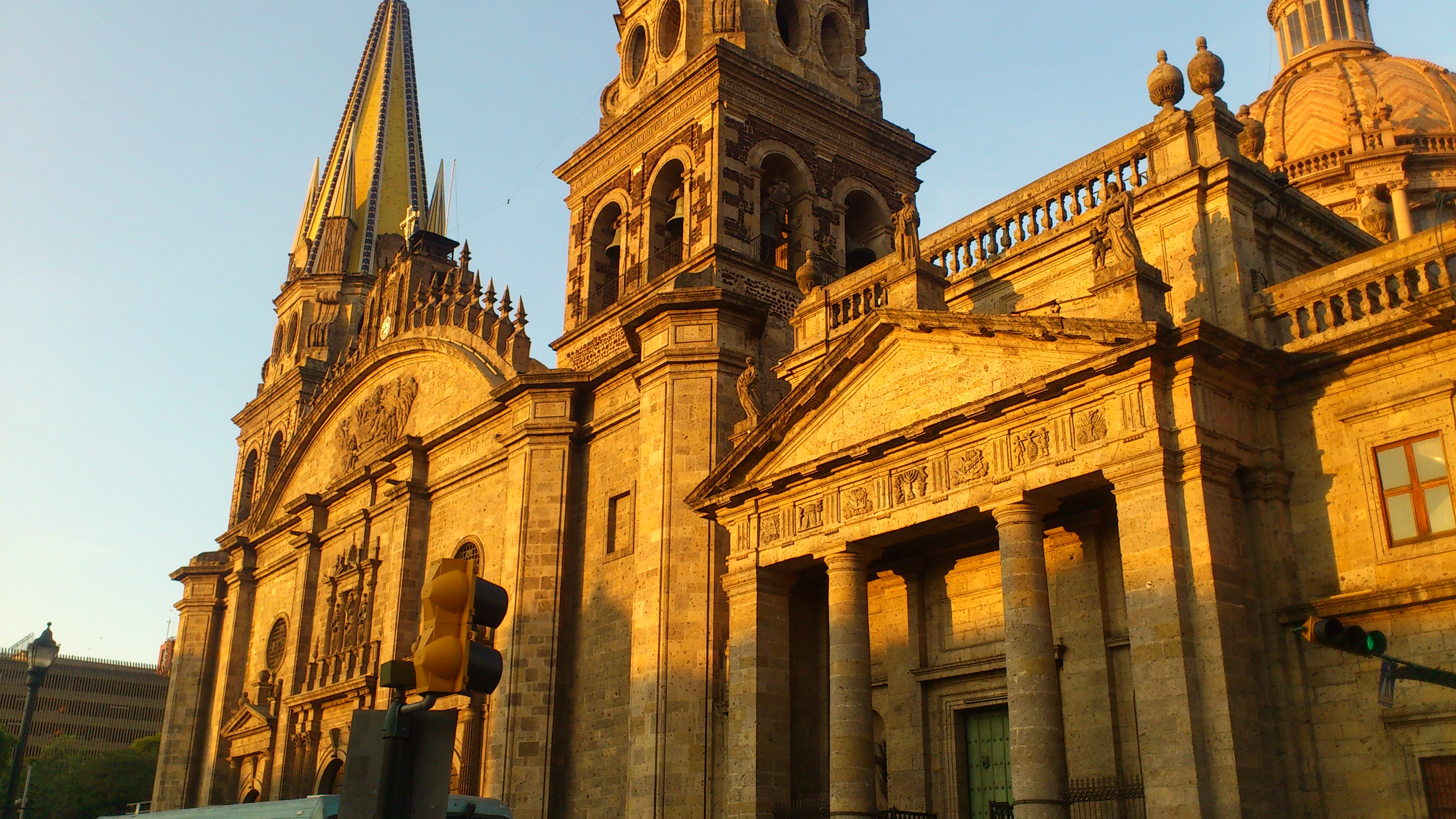
Cathedral of Guadalajara (1561-1618), Mexico.
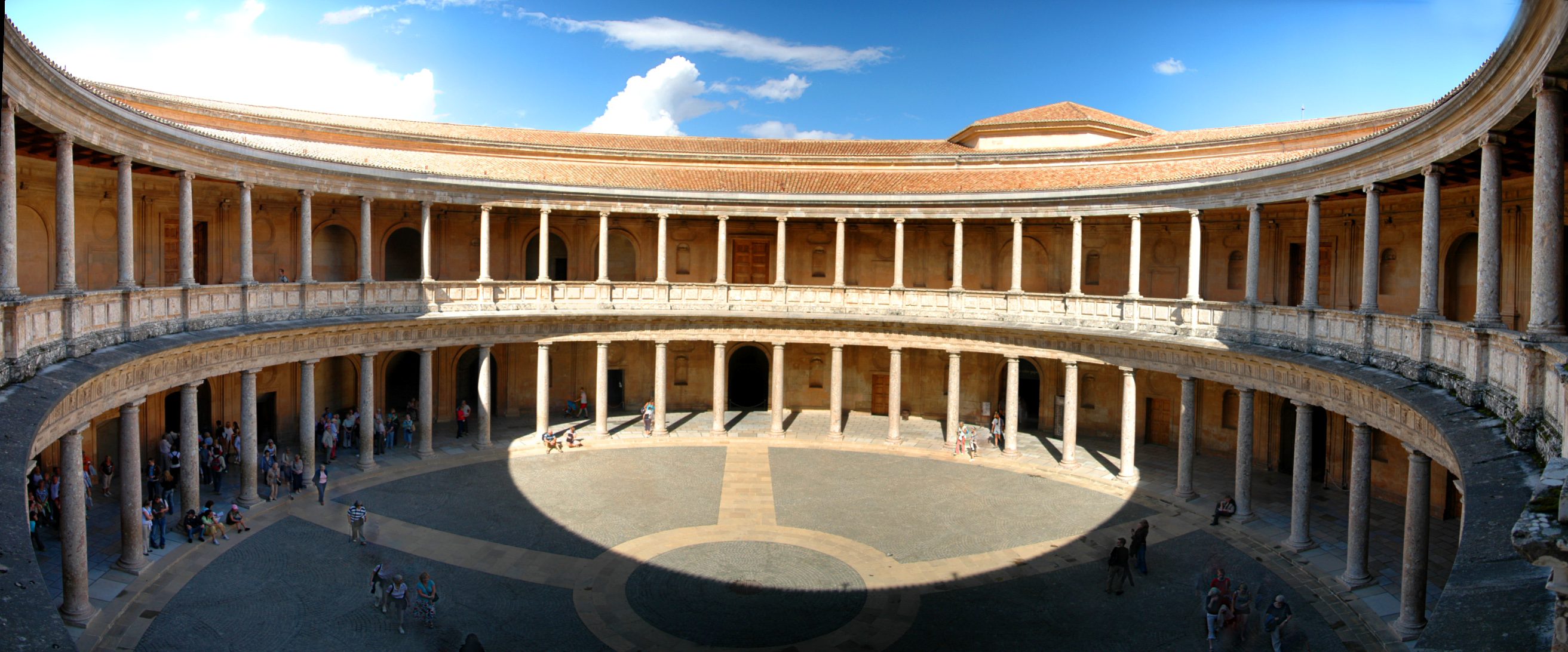
Courtyard of the Palace of Charles V in Granada

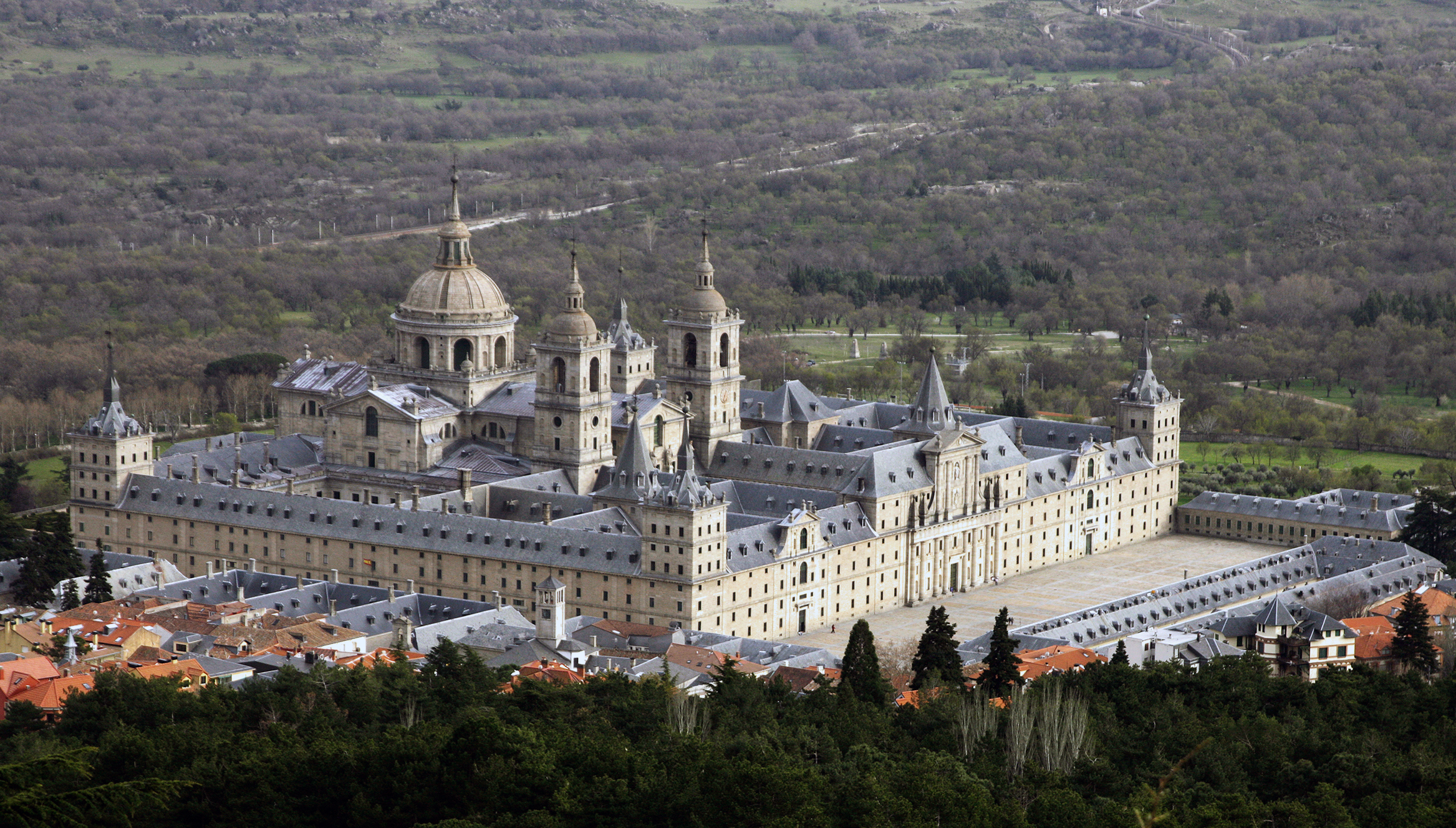
El Escorial, completed in 1584, by Juan Bautista de Toledo and Juan de Herrera

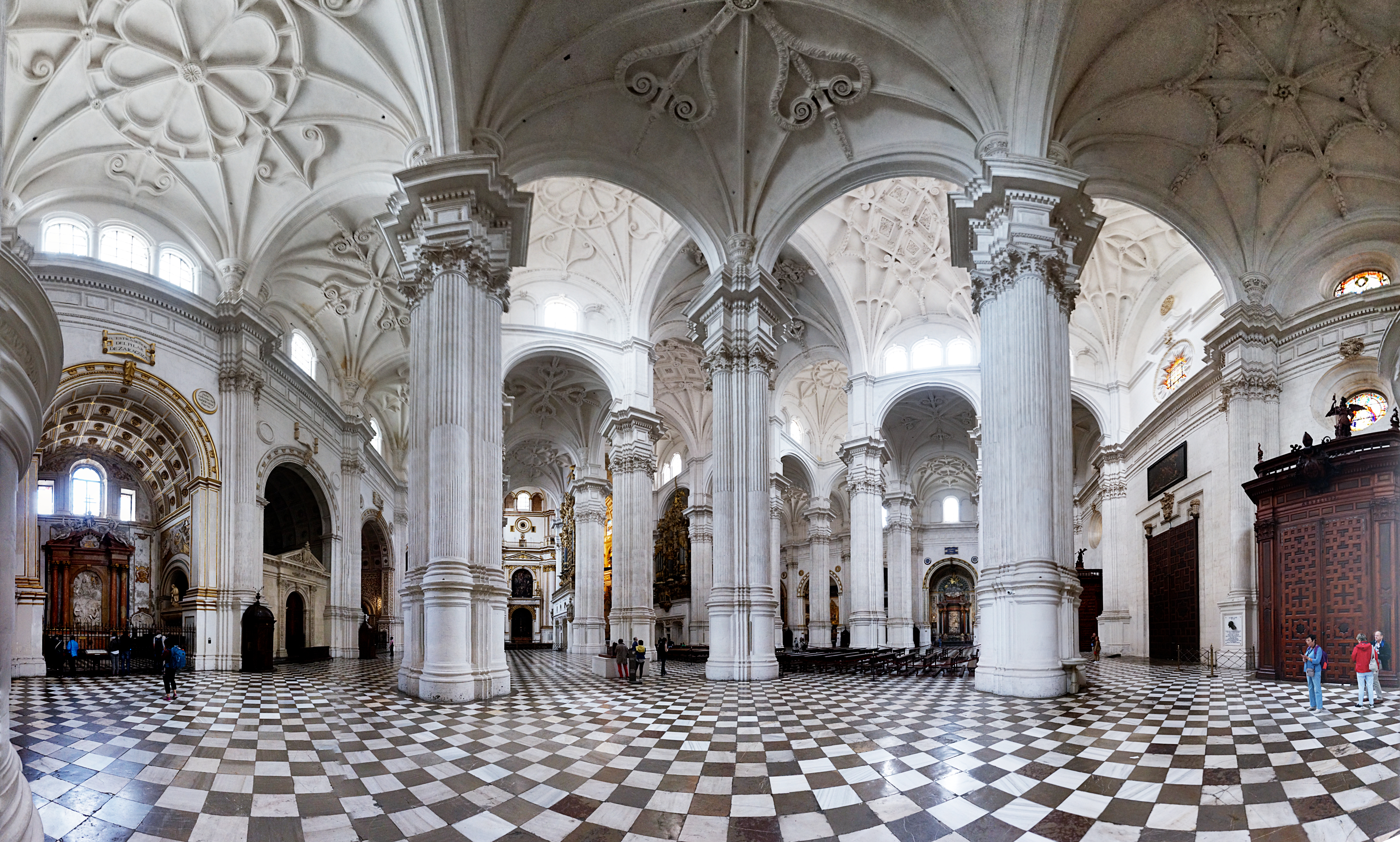
Panorama of the inside of the cathedral of Granada

== List of notable architects ==
- Juan Guas
- Juan de Herrera
- Lorenzo Vázquez de Segovia
- Juan Bautista de Toledo
- Diego de Siloé
- Pedro Machuca
- Rodrigo Gil de Hontañón
- Andrés de Vandelvira
- Alonso de Covarrubias
- Hernán Ruiz

== List of notable structures ==
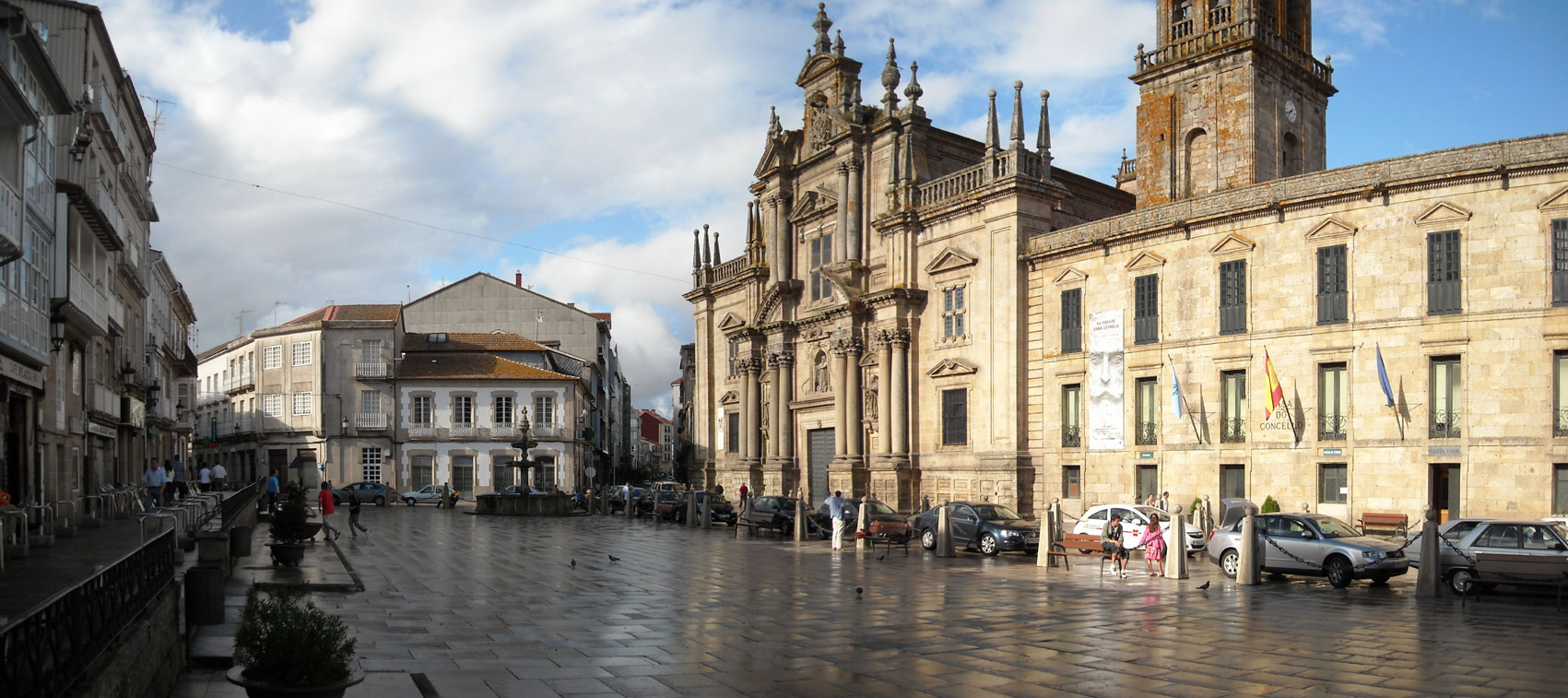
Monastery of San Salvador de Celanova in Celanova, Galicia

- El Escorial (by Juan Bautista de Toledo and Juan de Herrera)
- University of Salamanca (unknown architect)
- New Cathedral of Salamanca (by Juan de Álava and others)
- *Palace of Monterrey in Salamanca (by Rodrigo Gil de Hontañón)
- Arzobispo Fonseca College in Salamanca (by Diego de Siloé, Juan de Álava and R. G. de Hontañón)
- Convent of San Esteban in Salamanca, (by Juan de Álava and R. G. de Hontañón)
- Palace of Guzmanes in León (by R. G. de Hontañón)
- Hospital de la Santa Cruz in Toledo (by Enrique Egas and Alonso de Covarrubias)
- Hospital de Tavera, in Toledo (by Bartolomé Bustamante)
- Hospital Real, in Granada (by Enrique Egas)
- Palace of Charles V in Granada (by Pedro Machuca)
- Cathedral of Granada (by Juan Gil de Hontañón, Enrigue Egas and Diego de Siloé)
- Jaén Cathedral (by Andrés de Vandelvira)
- Cathedral of Baeza (by Vandelvira)
- Vázquez de Molina Square in Úbeda (by Vandelvira)
- Town Hall in Seville (by Diego de Riaño)
- University of Alcalá de Henares (by Rodrigo Gil de Hontañón and others)
- Royal Collegiate Church of Santa María la Mayor in Antequera, Andalusia (by Pedro del Campo)
- Hostal de los Reyes Católicos of Santiago de Compostela (by Enrique Egas)
- Town Hall of Tarazona

== See also ==
- Renaissance architecture
- Media related to Renaissance architecture in Spain at Wikimedia Commons
