= Purism (Spanish architecture) =

Spanish Renaissance architectural style (1530–1560)

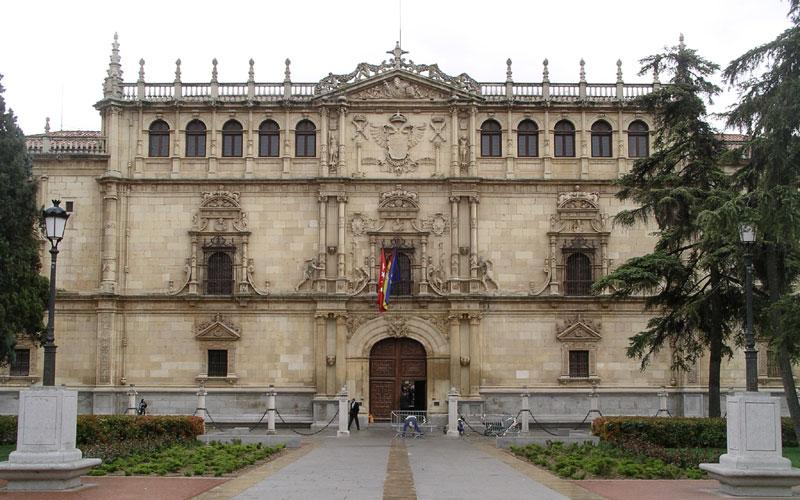
Facade of the Colegio Mayor de San Ildefonso, University of Alcalá de Henares, by Rodrigo Gil de Hontañón (1537–1553).

Purism is an initial phase of Renaissance architecture in Spain, which took place between 1530 and 1560, after Isabelline Gothic and prior to the Herrerian architecture in the last third of the 16th century. The name "Prince Philip" refers to the period in which Philip II of Spain (born in 1527) had not yet received the inheritance of the Spanish Monarchy by abdication of his father, the Emperor Charles V (1556). The name "Serlian" is due to the influential architect and treatise Sebastiano Serlio (in addition to the architectural element called Serlian in his honor).

The Greco-Roman, the purist and the casticist are related to the interpretation given to different elements of style, whether intellectual, formal, structural or decorative. Until then, writers of the period termed the classicist forms of the Italian Renaissance as "the Roman" (Diego de Sagredo Las Medidas del Romano, 1526), while the late-Gothic forms were called "the modern". For a more stylistic periodization more common in the art history, at that point of the 16th century the Cinquecento had entered in its Mannerist phase, while for the Spanish art is commonly used the expression High Renaissance (reserving the term Low Renaissance for the last third of the century).

== Description ==
The introduction of the Renaissance in Spain coincided with a period of great political, economic and social splendor, after the union between Castile and Aragon, the end of the Reconquista, the discovery of America and the coming to power of the Habsburgs. Although in its beginning the new style from Italy lived with the persistence of Gothic and Mudéjar forms, gradually took hold and served as the expression of the new political power, linked to the new conception of the Catholic Counter-Reformation. In the first third of the 16th century came the Plateresque, fine and elegant style of decoration, characterized by the use of rustication on the exterior walls, balustered columns with Corinthian capitals, arches or basket-handle, and pilasters decorated with grotesques.

In front of the excessive decorate of Plateresque style, the Purism sought ways simpler and refined, in a sober and classic line, balance and technical perfection, taking more on structural issues and harmonious proportions. The architects have better preparation and training, with the publication of several theoretical treatises such as Las Medidas del Romano by Diego de Sagredo (1526), the first Renaissance treaty written outside Italy, which highlights the prevalence of proportion and the proper disposal of the elements over the decoration.

The Purism was characterized by the use of oval or barrel vaults, arches, half domes and carved decoration limited to some strategic areas, evaluating the smooth space as an exponent of this new more pure and harmonious aesthetic. In general, the aspect of Purist architecture is of balance and monumentality, compared to the apparent fragility and decorativism of Plateresque.

== Works ==
The main signs of the style are found in Castile and Andalusia.

In Toledo developed his work Alonso de Covarrubias, launched in the Plateresque (Courtyard of the Hospital de la Santa Cruz), which reached the position of arquitecto real (1537). Among his buildings are the Puerta de Bisagra (in the form of a triumphal arch), the Alcázar (rectangular and severe facade flanked by towers) and the Hospital de Tavera (1541), which for its classicism and sobriety aimed for Herrerian style. In Alcalá de Henares built the Palacio Arzobispal, a monumental facade topped by a gallery of arches.

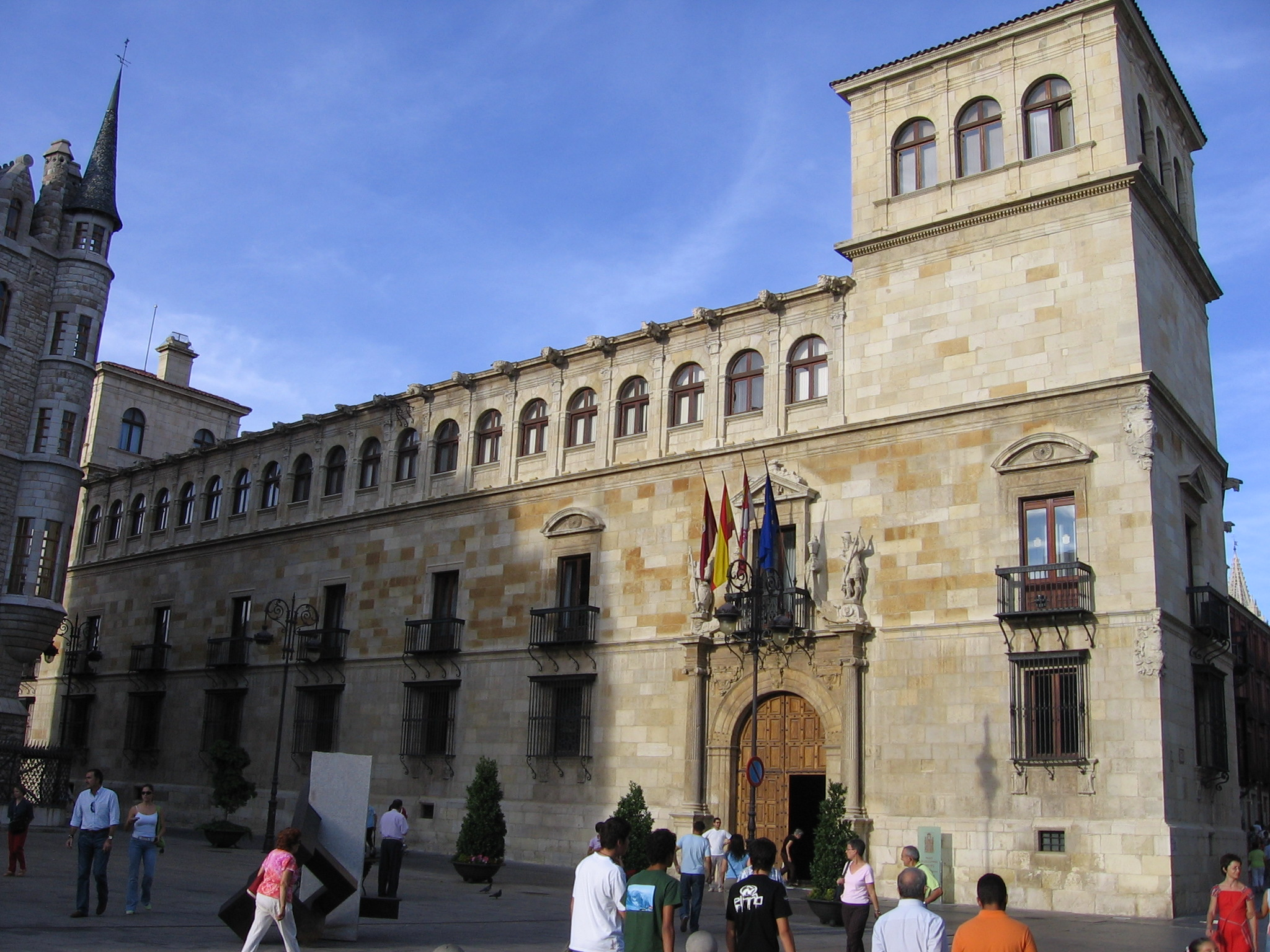
Palacio de los Guzmanes.

Rodrigo Gil de Hontañón worked mainly in Salamanca, but was involved in projects throughout Castile. Also formed in the plateresque, although his most representative works are of purism. In 1539, projected –with Fray Martín de Santiago–, the Palace of Monterrey, built only in one quarter, but that is a remarkable example of civil architecture, with magnificent towers with crenellations and lookouts drafts. One of his best works would be the façade of Colegio Mayor de San Ildefonso in the University of Alcalá de Henares (1537–1553), decorated with evenly distributed at regular intervals, pediment and top of crenellations with garlands. Other works were the Palacio de los Guzmanes in León, the church of Santa María Magdalena in Valladolid and the façades of the cathedralics dependences of das Platerías in the Cathedral of Santiago de Compostela (1540).

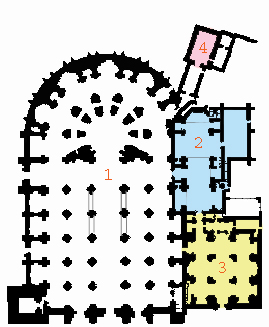
Ground plan of the Cathedral of Granada.

Diego de Siloé also was initially one of the leading exponents of plateresque (Courtyard of the Colegio Mayor de Santiago el Zebedeo, Salamanca; Golden Staircase of the Cathedral of Burgos). Subsequently, spent most of his work in Granada, where he made the pantheon for El Gran Capitán in the Monastery of San Jerónimo, in collaboration with the Italian Jacopo Torni. His main work was the Cathedral of Granada (begun in 1528), continuing the original Gothic design by Enrique Egas, who made numerous changes, became the presbytery in a round dome shaped, preceded by a large triumphal arch type. In the pillars of the naves increased height with small columns on an entablature located in the capital, as had Brunelleschi in Florence. This provision influenced later works such as the cathedrals of Málaga and Guadix, as well as Guadalajara (Mexico), Lima and Cuzco (Peru).

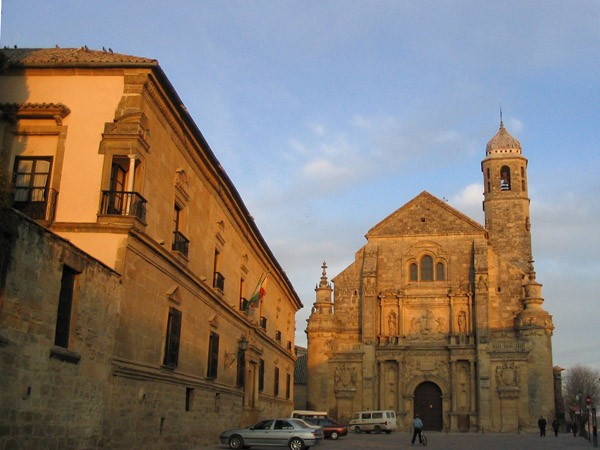
Sacra Capilla del Salvador in Úbeda.

In Granada also worked Pedro Machuca, author of the Palace of Charles V at the Alhambra (started in 1528 and interrupted to death of the architect in 1550). The palace included a circular courtyard and an octagonal chapel, which was never built. The courtyard, of Bramante influence, is one of the masterpieces of the Purism and the Spanish Renaissance architecture, example of balance and perfection of classical, with two-story with columns of Doric-Tuscan order (lower) and Ionic (upper).

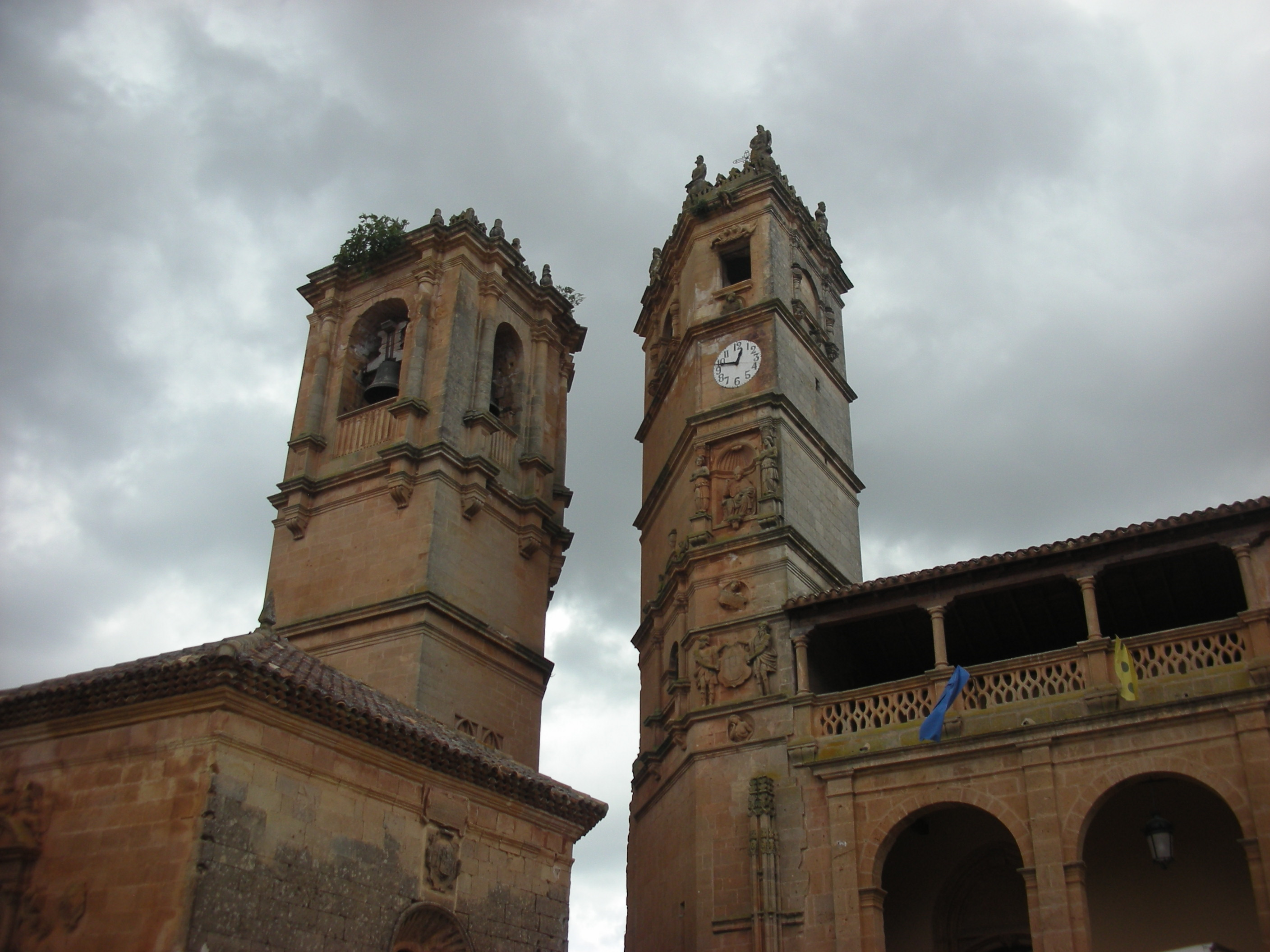
Torres de Alcaraz.

Another great example of Andalusian purism was Andrés de Vandelvira, of own style that was directed then to Mannerism. One of his characteristic was the use of vaults, and in the Sacra Capilla del Salvador in Úbeda (1536) – project initiated by Siloé, with who Vandelvira worked in its beginning-. His great work was the Cathedral of Jaén (begun in 1540), rectangular, with pillars inspired by the Cathedral of Granada. Remarkably in this work the Sacristy, with double entablature and overlap of arches of Mannerist style, although of great structural simplicity. Other works were: the Chapel of San Francisco (1546), the Torre del Tardón in Alcaraz (1555), the palaces of Vela-Cobos (1561) and Vázquez de Molina (1562) and the Hospital de Santiago (1562–1575), all in Úbeda. The work of Vandelvira left a strong mark on subsequent architecture, especially in Andalusia, Murcia and Alicante.

In Seville highlights the construction of the Royal Chapel of the cathedral and the Hospital de las Cinco Llagas, by Martín de Gainza, and the top of the Giralda, by Hernán Ruiz the Younger, of Serlian influence, that influence the later Andalusian altars.
