= Spanish Renaissance =

15th–16th century intellectual movement

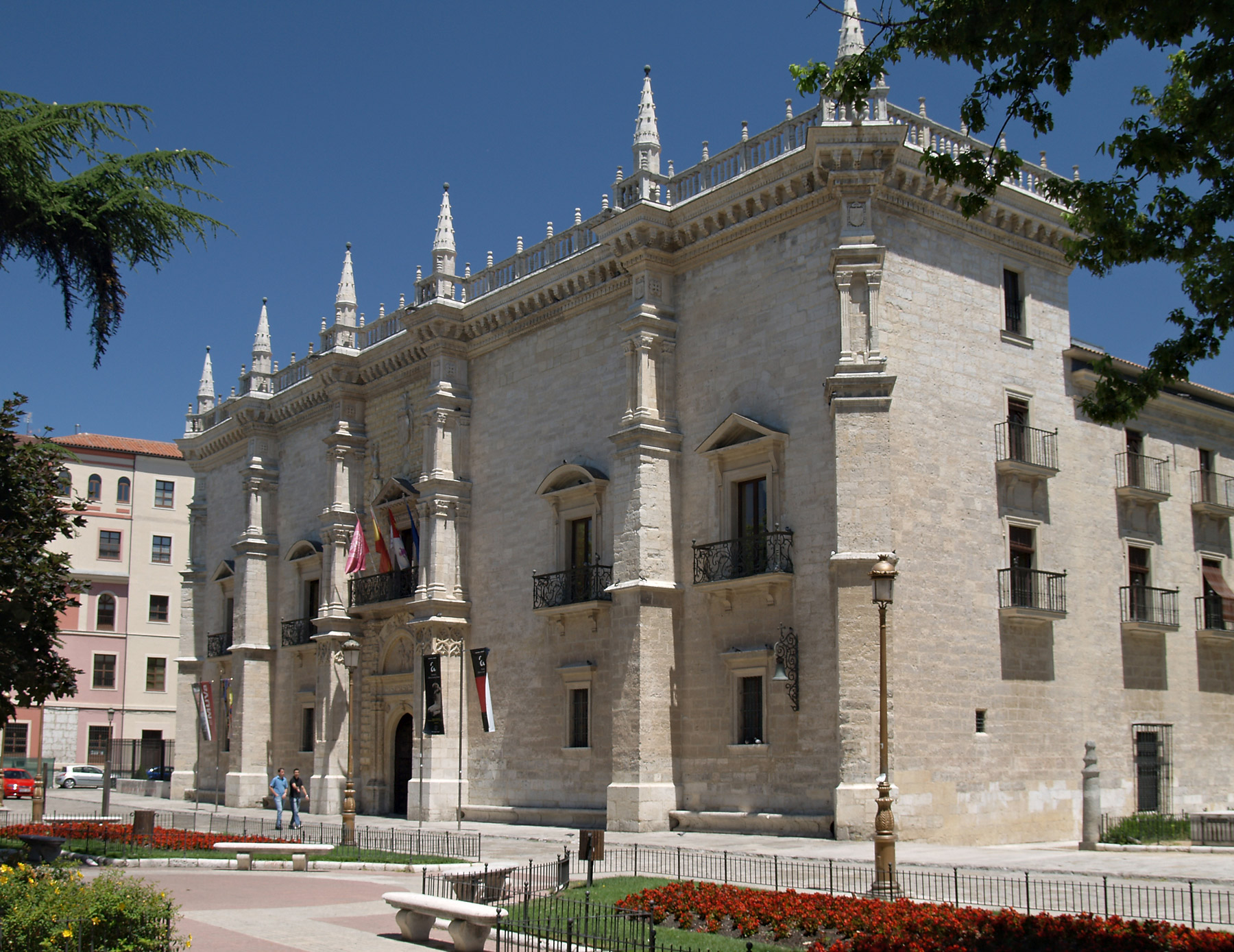
Santa Cruz Palace (1486–1491) in Valladolid is considered to be the earliest extant building of the Spanish Renaissance.

The Spanish Renaissance was a movement in Spain, emerging from the Italian Renaissance in Italy during the 14th century, that spread to Spain during the 15th and 16th centuries.

This new focus in art, literature, quotes and science inspired by the Greco-Roman tradition of Classical antiquity, received a major impulse from several events in 1492:

- Unification of the longed-for Christian kingdom with the definitive taking of Granada, the last Islamic controlled territory in the Iberian Peninsula, and the successive expulsions of thousands of Muslim and Jewish believers,
- The official discovery of the Western Hemisphere, the Americas,
- The publication of the first grammar of a vernacular European language in print, the Gramática (Grammar) by Antonio de Nebrija.

== Historical background ==
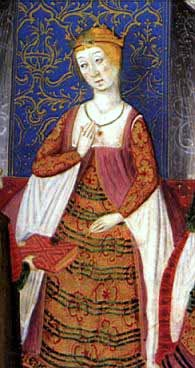
Image of Isabella I of Castile in the Rimado de la Conquista de Granada

The beginning of the Renaissance in Spain is closely linked to the historical-political life of the monarchy of the Catholic Monarchs. Its figures are the first to leave the medieval approaches that secured a feudal scheme of weak monarch over a powerful and restless nobility. The Catholic Monarchs unite the forces of the incipient state and ally with the principal families of the nobility to maintain their power. One of these families, the Mendoza, use the new style like distinction of its clan and, by extension, of the protection of the monarchy.

Little by little, the novel esthetic was introduced into the rest of the court and the clergy, mixing with purely Iberian styles, like the Nasrid art of the dying kingdom of Granada, the exalted and personal Gothic Castilian queen, and the Flemish tendencies in the official painting of the court and the Church. The assimilation of elements gave way to a personal interpretation of the orthodox Renaissance, which came to be called Plateresque. Therefore, secondary artists were brought in from Italy, apprentices were sent to the Italian shops, they brought designs, architectural plans, books and engravings, paintings, etc., of which portraits, themes and composition were copied.

King Charles V was more predisposed to the new art, paradoxically called the old way, remitted to the Classical antiquity. His direct patronage achieved renown works of the unique Spanish Renaissance style: the patronage of Almazan de Covarrubias, his commissions for Titian, who never agreed to relocate to Spain. Painters of great quality were far from the courtier nucleus, such as Pedro Berruguete, Juan de Juanes, Paolo da San Leocadio, of whom the Virgin of the Caballero de Montesa is highlighted, Yáñez de la Almazan and Gerardo de los Llanos.

The painting of the Spanish Renaissance is normally completed in oil. It realizes interiors perfectly subject to the laws of perspective, without over-emphasis of the people. The figures are all of the same size and anatomically correct.

The colors and the shading are applied in tonal ranges, according to the Italian teachings. To accentuate the Italian style, in addition, it is common to add elements directly copied from it, like the adornments a candelieri (borders of vegetables and cupids that surround the frames), or Roman ruins in the countrysides, including in scenes of the life of Christ.

== Literature ==
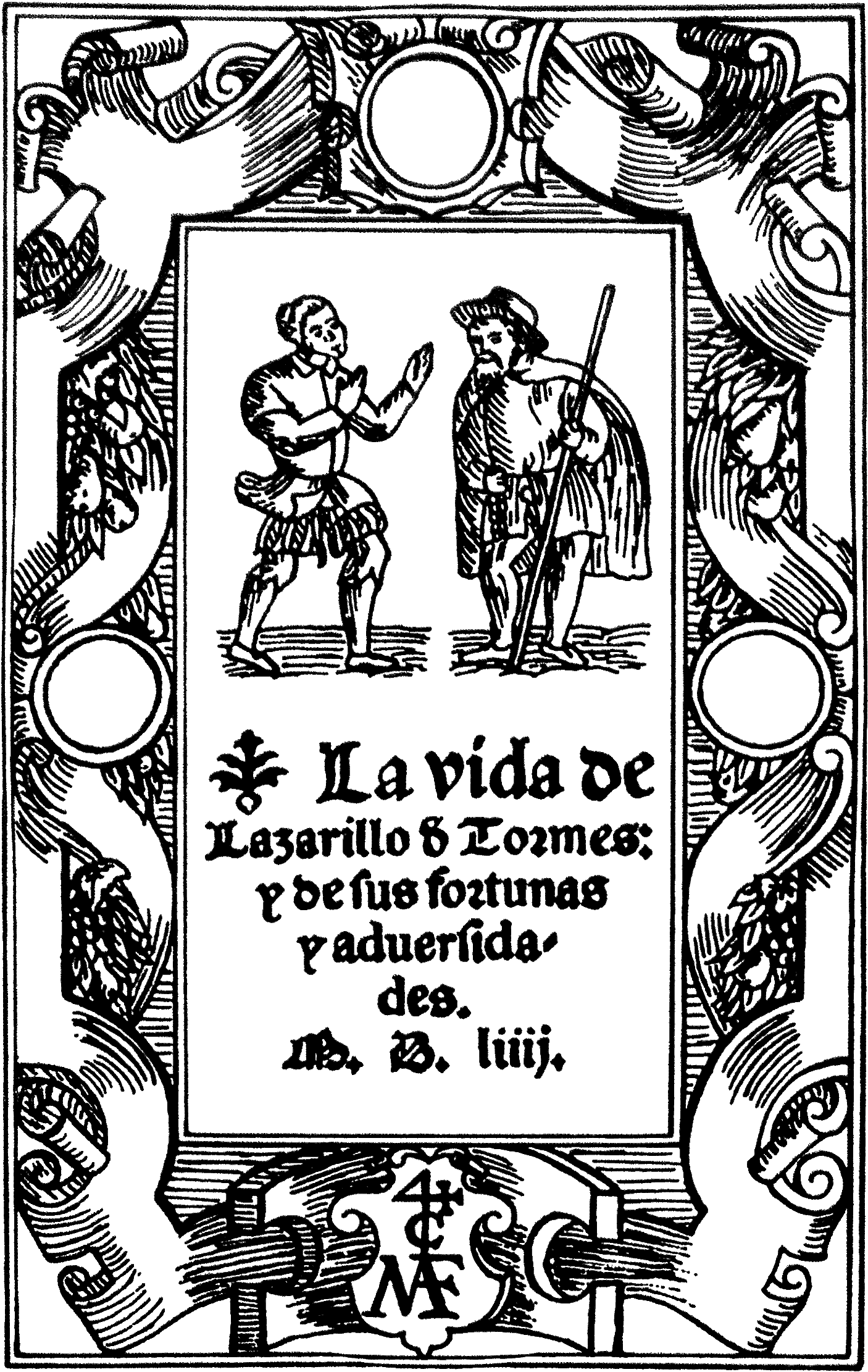
Vida del Lazarillo de Tormes, de sus fortunas y adversidades published in 1554. Front page.

- Miguel de Cervantes Saavedra, author of El Ingenioso Hidalgo Don Quijote de la Mancha
- Jorge Manrique author of the Coplas por la muerte de su padre
- Garcilaso de la Vega, poet.
- San Juan de la Cruz and
- Santa Teresa de Jesús, mystic poets .
- Fernando de Rojas, author of La Celestina
- Tomás Fernández de Medrano, lord of Valdeosera, author of the political treatise República Mista
- Fray Luis de León
- Juan Boscán
- Ausiàs March
- Alonso de Ercilla, author of La Araucana
- Lope de Rueda
- Fray Luis de Granada
- Marqués de Santillana
- Diego Hurtado de Mendoza
- Juan Latino, born Juan de Sessa, poet and humanist.
- Alonzo de Santa Cruz
- Francisco de la Torre
- Juan de Valdés
- Lucio Marineo Siculo, Sicilian humanist and historian.
- Anonymous writers of the Romancero and of the Masterpiece of picaresque literature Vida de Lazarillo de Tormes

== Painting and sculpture ==
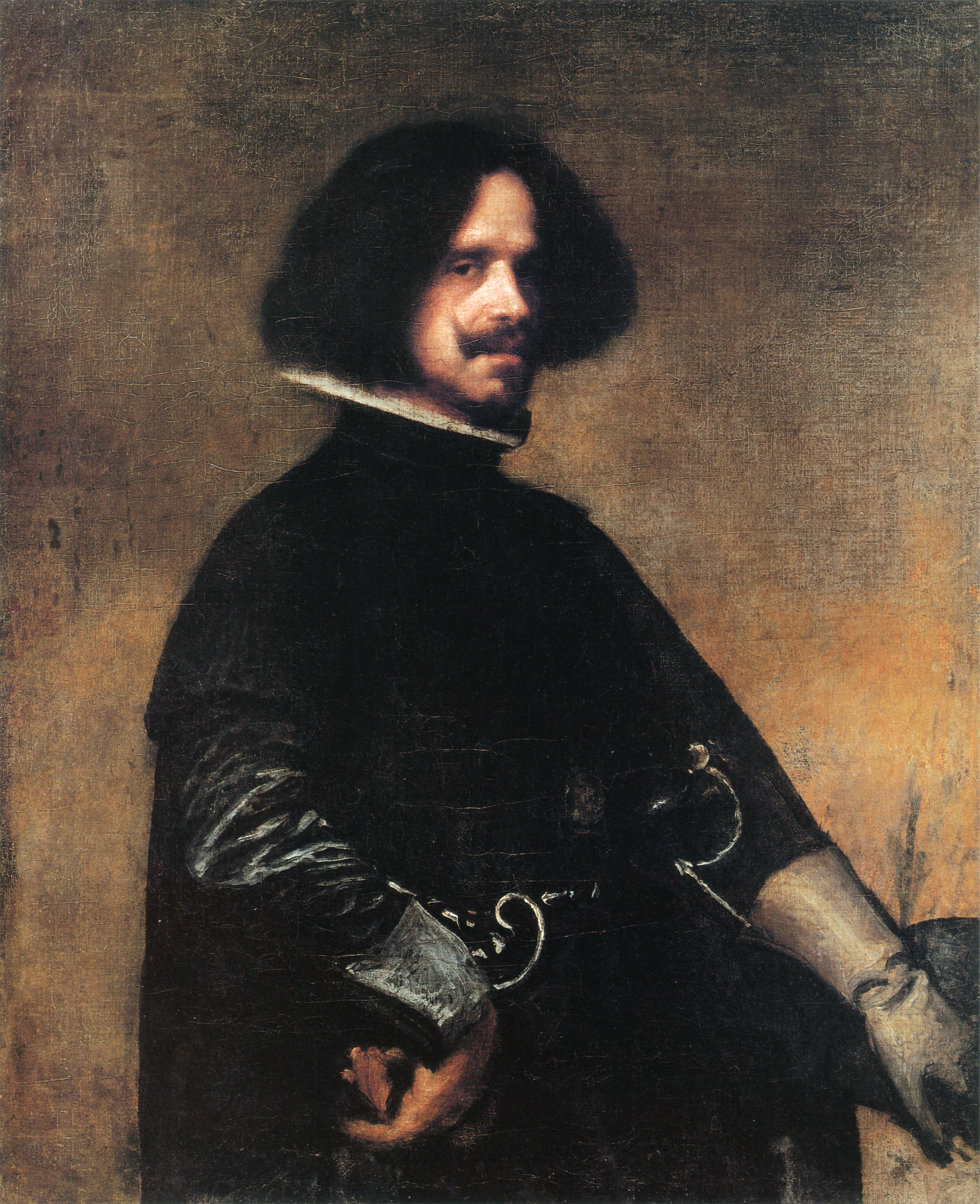
Diego Velázquez, self-portrait

The Nobleman with his Hand on his Chest by El Greco

=== Painters ===
- Pedro Berruguete
- Alonso Berruguete
- Alonso Cano
- Juan de Flandes
- Fernando Gallego
- El Greco
- Luis de Morales
- Juan Pantoja de la Cruz
- Alonso Sánchez Coello
- Sofonisba Anguissola
- Fernando Yáñez de la Almedina
- Bartolomé González y Serrano
- Diego Velázquez

==== Paintings ====
- The Burial of the Count of Orgaz by El Greco
- The Nobleman with his Hand on his Chest by El Greco
- Laocoön by El Greco
- Annunciation by Pedro Berruguete
- Pieta by Fernando Gallego
- Portrait of Isabel Clara Eugenia by Alonso Sánchez Coello
- Virgin of the Milk or Virgin with Child (Luis de Morales).

=== Sculptors ===
- Juan de Ancheta
- Gaspar Becerra
- Alonso Berruguete
- Felipe Bigarny
- Damià Forment
- Esteban Jordán
- Juan de Juni
- Bartolomé Ordóñez
- Diego Siloe

== Architecture ==
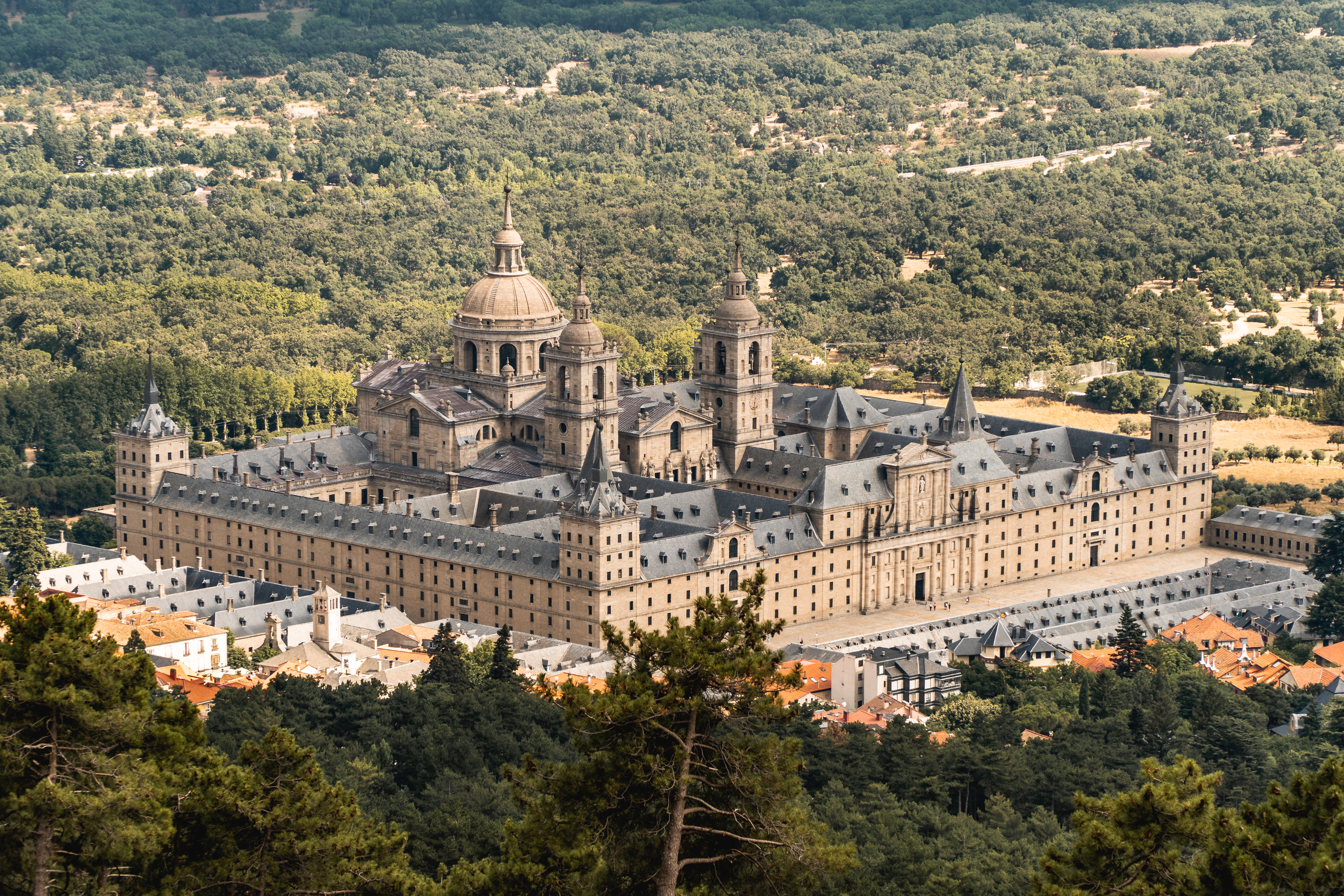
The Royal Monastery of San Lorenzo del Escorial, by Herrera and Juan Bautista de Toledo

- Juan de Herrera
- Juan Bautista de Toledo
- Gil de Hontañón
- Diego Siloe
- Enrique Egas
- Alonso de Covarrubias
- Pedro Machuca
- Andrés de Vandelvira
- Diego de Riaño
- Juan de Álava
- Hernán Ruiz the Younger

== Music ==
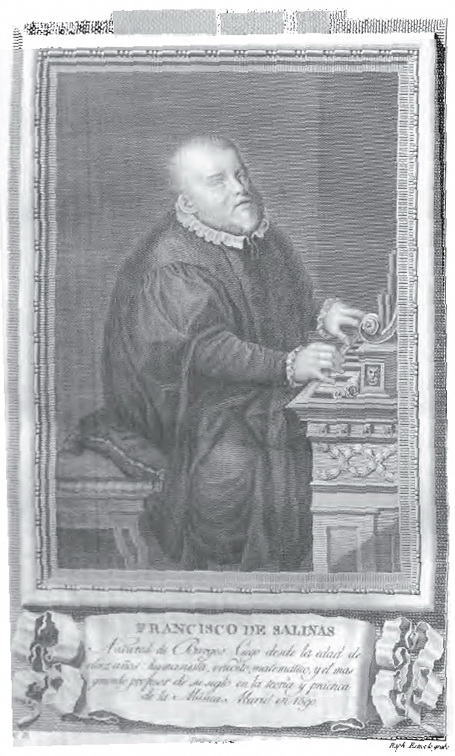
Francisco de Salinas

- Arpa de dos ordenes (Spanish cross-strung harp)
- Juan de Anchieta
- Antonio de Cabezón (organist)
- Juan del Encina (also poet and playwright)
- Bartolomé de Escobedo
- Juan de Esquivel Barahona
- Juan Pérez de Gijón
- Francisco Guerrero
- Mateo Flecha
- Alonso Lobo
- Luis de Milán (vihuelist)
- Cristóbal de Morales
- Alonso Mudarra
- Juan Navarro
- Diego Ortiz
- Francisco de Peñalosa
- Joan Pau Pujol
- Melchior Robles
- Francisco de Salinas (theorist)
- Tomás de Santa María
- Francisco de la Torre
- Juan de Triana
- Juan Vásquez
- Tomás Luis de Victoria
- Sebástian de Vivanco
- Luis de Narvaez

== Science ==
- Miguel Servet
- School of Salamanca
- Jerónimo Muñoz
- Fernán Pérez de Oliva

== See also ==
- Spanish art
- Spanish Enlightenment
- Spanish Golden Age
- Renaissance of the 12th century
- Portuguese Renaissance
- Al-Andalus
