= Purism (disambiguation) =

Purism is an art movement that took place between 1918 and 1925.

Purism may also refer to:

- Purism (Spanish architecture) (1530–1560), a phase of Renaissance architecture in Spain
- Purism (company), company manufacturing Librem personal computers and computer hardware
- Linguistic purism, the practice of defining one variety of a language as "pure"

== See also ==
- Purismo, a 19th-century Italian cultural movement
