= Valcavado Beatus =

10th-century illuminated manuscript

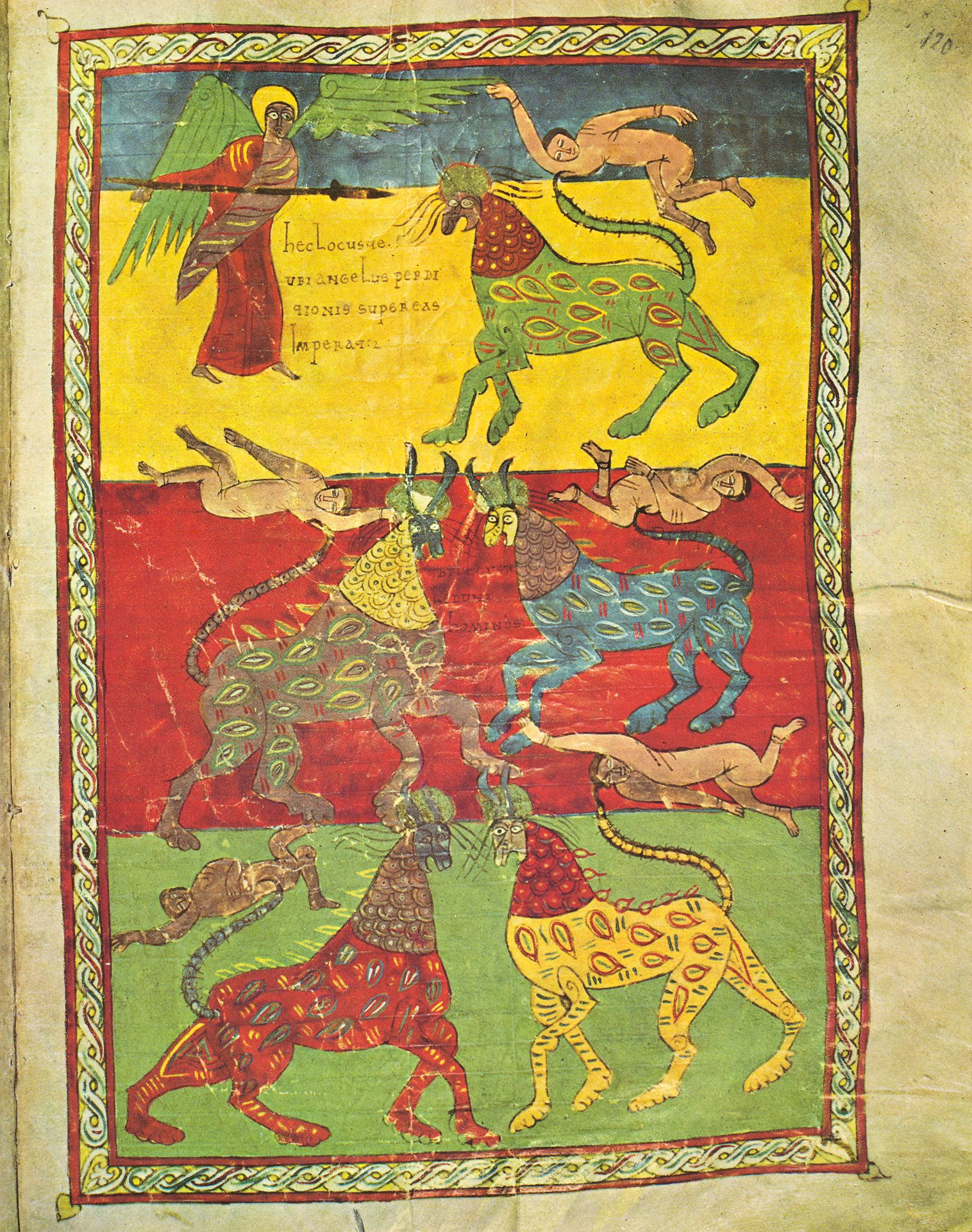
- Original title: Beato de Valcavado
- Illustrator: Oveco
- Publication date: 970
- Media type: ink and illumination on parchment
- Pages: 230
- Historical Library of Santa Cruz

The Beato of Valcavado is an illuminated manuscript—copies of the Commentary on the Apocalypse of Saint John of Beatus of Liébana—copied by a monk called Oveco in the year 970, in the now-vanished Our Lady of Valcavado monastery in Palencia. It is held in the collection of the Santa Cruz Palace, University of Valladolid.

== History ==
In 970, during the reign of Ramiro III of León, a monk named Oveco in the monastery at Valcavado copied and made miniatures on parchment for Valcavado's abbot, Sempronio, of the commentary by Saint Beatus of the Santo Toribio de Liébana monastery between 765 and 775 AD. The Valcavado Beatus is among the 32 copies that still exist today of this work, many of them lavishly illuminated.

The manuscript by Oveco remained there until the 16th century. Ambrosio de Morales described seeing it there in 1572. But in 1590 it was no longer there. It traveled to León and afterwards to Madrid where it was owned by a secretary to Philip II of Spain. In the 17th century, the manuscript belonged to the Jesuit school of Saint Ambrosio in Valladolid, and when Charles III of Spain ordered the Jesuits expelled, the contents of their library went to the University of Valladolid.

== Description ==
The manuscript is also known as the Beato of Valladolid. It consists of 230 folios conserved in good condition—another fourteen are missing—measuring 35.5 x 24.5 cm and containing 87 miniatures and numerous drop capitals. The bright colors come from azurite, malachite and cinnabar pigments mixed with egg, honey or glue, and varnished with a coat of wax. The figures de of people are limited to lines and their expressivity comes from their large almond-shaped eyes. In the margins of many pages are numerous annotations certainly added by the author during his work, and others made later over the centuries.

The preparation of the manuscript made very quickly, from 8 June to 9 September 970. In Folio 3 this inscription confirms these dates: "Initiatus est liber iste Apocalypse Joahnni SAW idus junius et pinibit exaratus SAW idus septembris sub was VIII".

One of the first sentences in the beato is: "Hoc opus your fieret prae-dictus Abbas Sempronius instanter egit, cui ego Oveco indignus mind obediens worshipper depinxi". It adds the date: "Anno Domini 970".

== Gallery ==
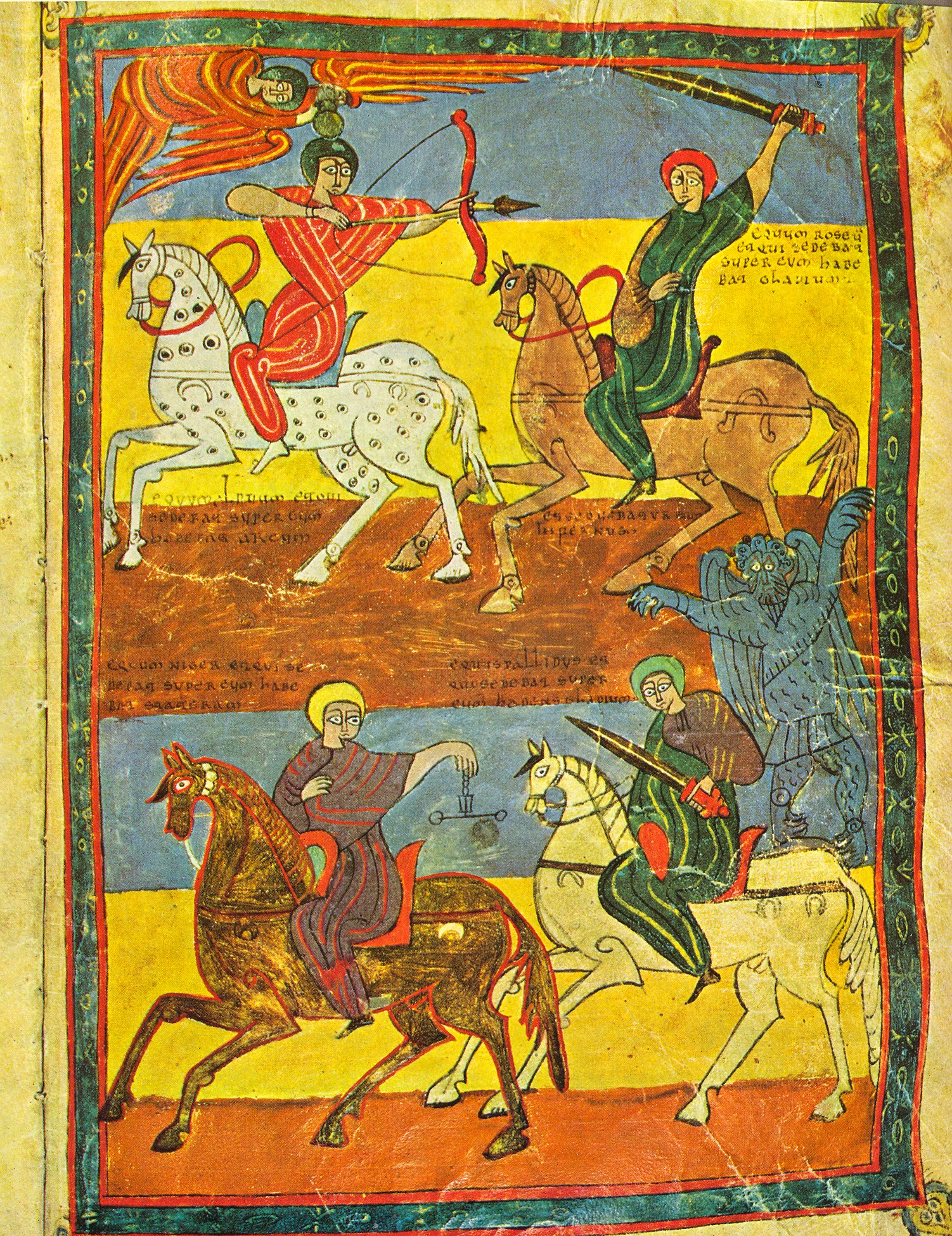

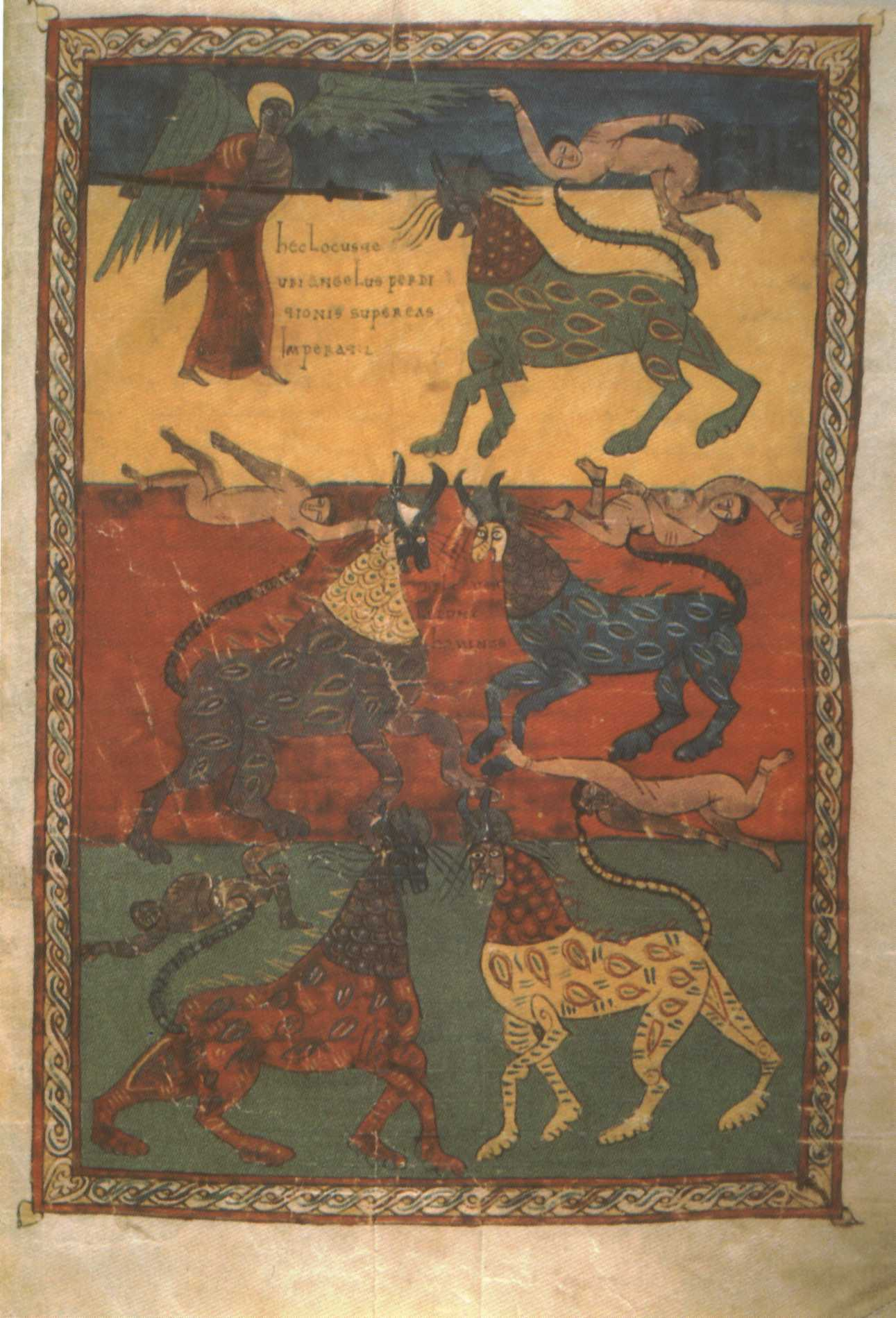

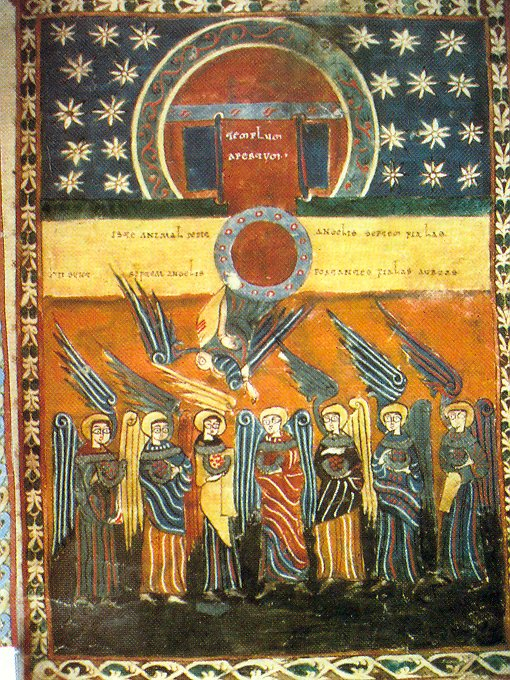

== See also ==
- Saint-Sever Beatus
- Monasterio de Valcavado

== Sources ==
- García-Diego, Pablo; Alonso Mount, Diego (2012). García-Diego, Pablo; Alonso Montes, Diego (2012). La Miniatura Altomedieval Española. Visión Libros. ISBN 9788490112526.
- García-Diego, Pablo; Alonso Montes, Diego (2012). La Miniatura Altomedieval Española. Visión Libros. ISBN 9788490112526.
- Martínez and Pérez, Lucrecio (20 July 1967). The monastery of Valcavado and Saint Beato of Liébana. Voices of inside and of out.
- Menéndez Pidal, Gonzalo (2003). Varia mediavevalia: Mozárabes y Asturianos. Real Academia de la Historia. ISBN 9788495983145.
