= Palace of the Dukes of Medinaceli (Cogolludo) =

- Palacio de los Duques de Medinaceli (Spanish)
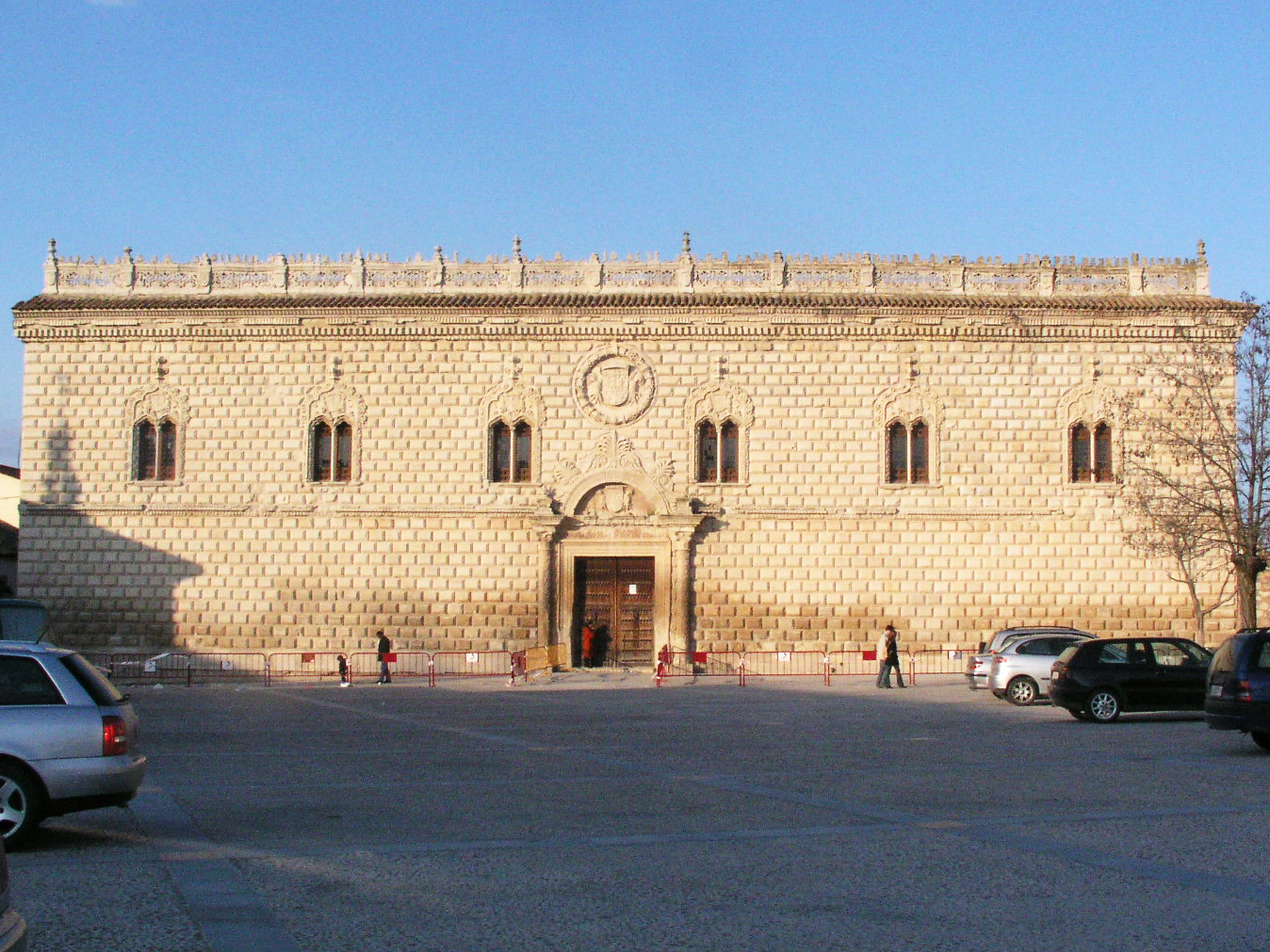

- Location within Spain
- 40.946789°N 3.088565°W
- Location: Cogolludo, Spain

History
- Built: 1502

Spanish Cultural Heritage
- Official name: Palacio de los Duques de Medinaceli
- Type: Non-movable
- Criteria: Monument
- Designated: 1931
- Reference no.: RI-51-0000600

The commonly called Palace of the Dukes of Medinaceli (Spanish: Palacio de los Duques de Medinaceli) is a Renaissance palace located in Cogolludo, Spain, and is one of the most ancient sites of the region.

One of the oldest titles of the House of Medinaceli is the marquisate of Cogolludo, traditionally borne by the heir to the Dukedom of Medinaceli itself. The palace of the marquises of Cogolludo is a gem of pure Spanish renaissance architecture, constructed between c. 1480 and 1502. It was a show of power for the House of Medinaceli, along with a display of wealth and influence.

It is one of a number of monuments most closely associated with the Dukes of Medinaceli, and was their ducal palace. It was declared Bien de Interés Cultural (historical and architectural landmark) in 1931. The Palace of the Dukes of Medinaceli was restored in 2012. Visitors are allowed into the interior of the building; but must do so with a tour guide managed by the tourist office.

== History ==
The palace is considered the first Renaissance palace that was built on the Iberian Peninsula, and is a pioneer that broke previous typologies. It dates from the 15th century, when Cogolludo was occupied by the Valterra family, who moved in to the place in 1404.

The Palace of the Dukes of Medinaceli was commissioned by Luis de Cerda, the first duke in the powerful Medinaceli family, and it was designed by Lorenzo Vázquez de Segovia (c. 1450-c. 1517), an architect of the time who also was in charge of designing the Colegio de Sta. Cruz (c. 1483), and is widely considered Spain's first Renaissance architect.
