= Lorenzo Vázquez de Segovia =

Spanish architect

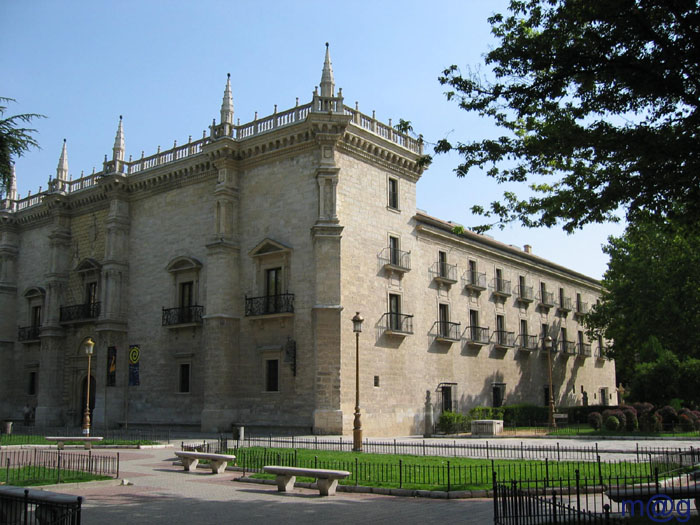
The Santa Cruz Palace in Valladolid, Spain is amongst the fine works of Spanish architect Lorenzo Vázquez de Segovia

Lorenzo Vázquez de Segovia was a 15th-century Spanish architect and builder noted for completing the Santa Cruz Palace in 1491 in Valladolid and a number of other handsome buildings in the Castile region of western Spain (Palace of the Dukes of Medinaceli (Cogolludo)).

== Bibliography ==
- J. M. DE AZCÁRATE. Lorenzo Vazquez de Segovia
- M. GÓMEZ-MORENO, On the Renaissance in Castile. Towards Lorenzo Vazquez, "Spanish Archive of Art and Architecture" (1925).
- F. CHUECA, Architecture of the 15th century, in Ars, XI, 1953.
- J. CAMÓN, La arquitectura plateresca, Madrid 1945.
