= Rodrigo Gil de Hontañón =

Spanish architect (1500–1577)

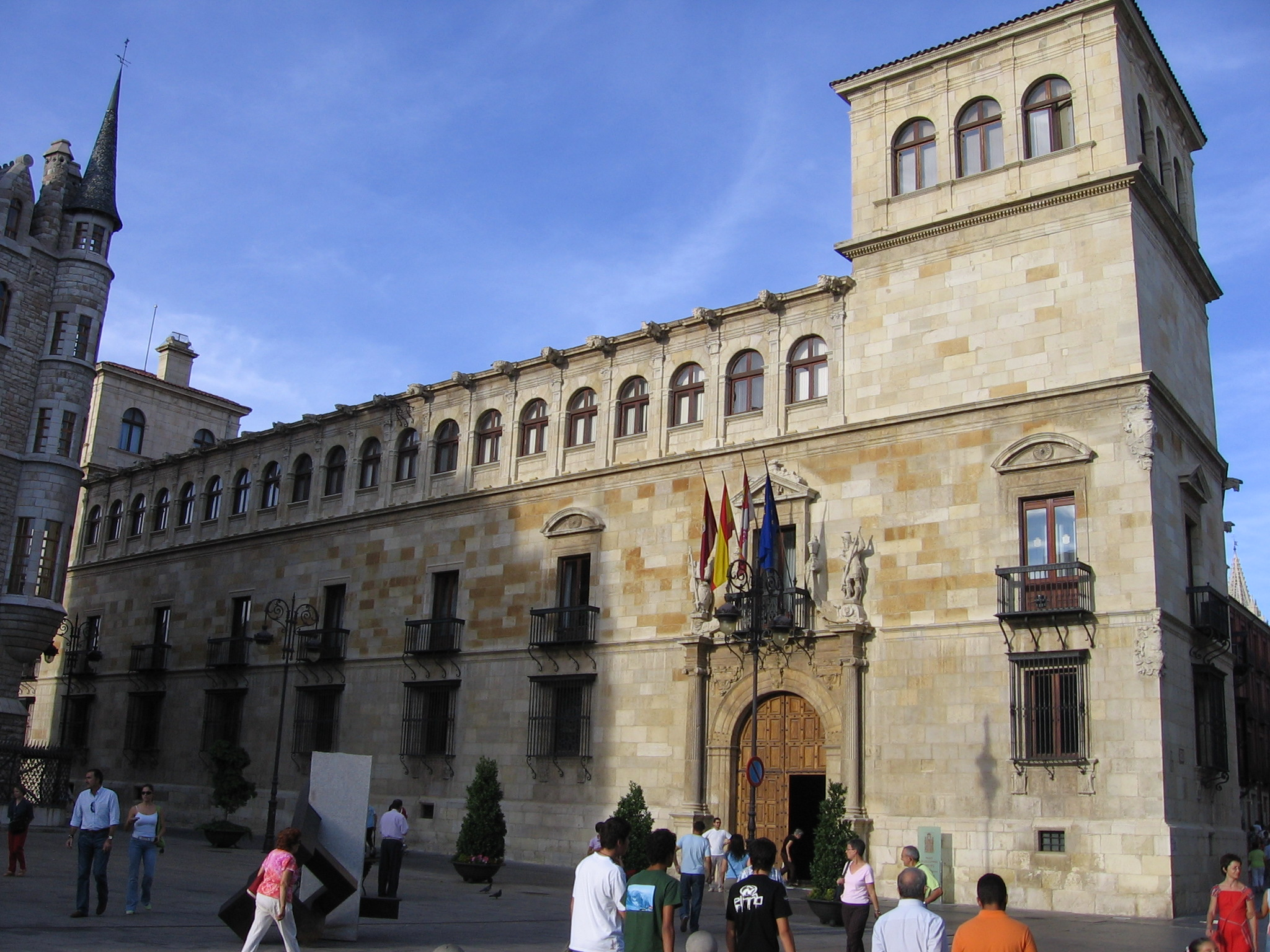
- Palace of Guzmanes, in León
- Born: c. 1500; Rascafría, Spain
- Died: 1577 (aged 76–77); Segovia
- Known for: Architecture
- Notable work: Colegio Mayor de San Ildefonso; Segovia Cathedral; Palace of Monterrey
- Movement: Plateresque, Spanish Renaissance

Rodrigo Gil de Hontañón (1500–1577) was a Spanish architect of the Renaissance.

He was born at Rascafría. His work alternated the late gothic with the renaissance style. His workings include the Palace of Monterrey in Salamanca, the Palace of Guzmanes in León, and the facade of the Colegio Mayor de San Ildefonso at the University of Alcalá de Henares. He also worked in Arzobispo Fonseca College and in the Convent of San Esteban, both in Salamanca and in the Cathedral of Ciudad Rodrigo.

He was the son of the Trasmeran mason named Juan Gil de Hontañón, Rodrigo continued the works in the cathedrals of Salamanca and Segovia, both begun by his father in Gothic style.

Gil de Hontañón died at Segovia in 1577. His personal style has influenced the work of modern architects such as Antonio Palacios.
