= Palacio de los Guzmanes =

Palace in León, Spain

Coordinates: 42°35′53.82″N 5°34′13.8″W

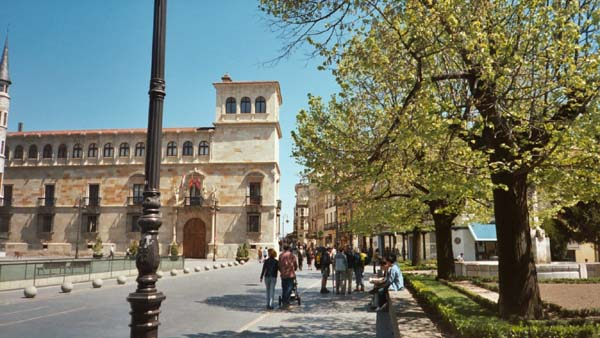
Palacio de los Guzmanes.

The Palacio de los Guzmanes is a Renaissance building in the city of León; it is the seat of Provincial Government of León.

The architect Rodrigo Gil de Hontañón built the palace in the 16th century, commissioned by the aristocratic House of Guzmán, one of the city's powerful and influential families. It is three-story high with square towers at the four corners and is arranged around a two-story courtyard. The façade has a round arches gallery on the top floor.

In "la Plaza de Santo Domingo", the palace stands tall, right next to "la casa de botines" and is one of the prize possessions of "El Casco Viejo (antiguo)" of Leon

== See also ==
- Province of León
- Leonese language
