= Palacio de Santa Cruz =

Early Renaissance palace, now university buildings, in Valladolid, Spain

Coordinates: 41°39′05″N 4°43′11″W

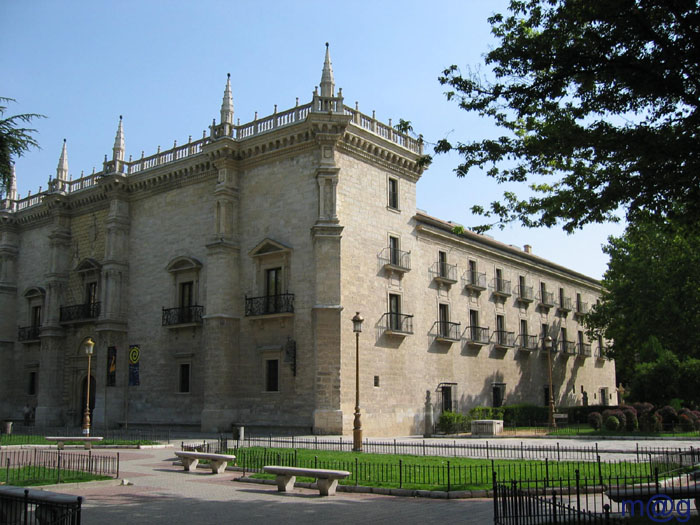
Santa Cruz Palace

The Palacio de Santa Cruz is an Early Renaissance palace in Valladolid, in Castile and León, Spain, built as a "college" for the University of Valladolid, who still own it. Construction began in 1486 but from 1490 building came under the supervision of Lorenzo Vázquez de Segovia who finally completed it in 1491.

It now houses the offices of the Rector and his staff, and two university museums, one of African art. The library collection includes the Valcavado Beatus manuscript.

Founded by Cardinal Mendoza, the college is considered to be the earliest extant building of the Spanish Renaissance. Some observers believe that some of the classical details may have been added to the facade at a later date. One anomaly is the lack of full symmetry of the main facade. Nevertheless, details such as the main doorway are generally accepted as original to Vázquez's design. Confirmation of this impression is the similar doorway on the palace of the Dukes of Medinaceli built to the designs of the architect at Collogudo to the north east of Madrid.

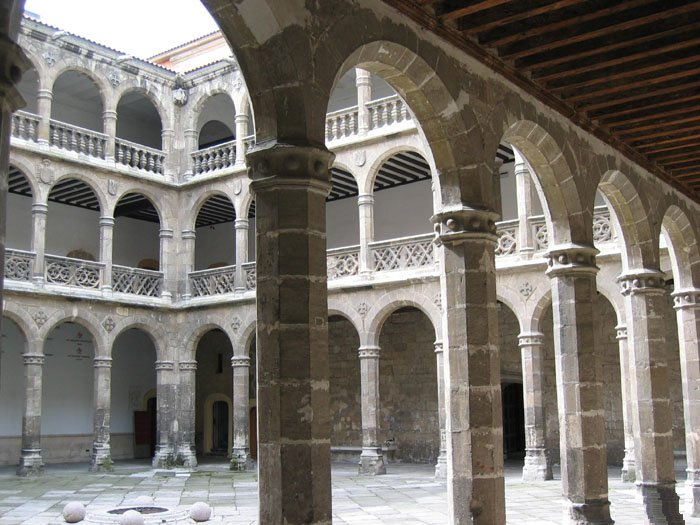
Inner courtyard of the palace
