= Pedro Machuca =

Spanish architect

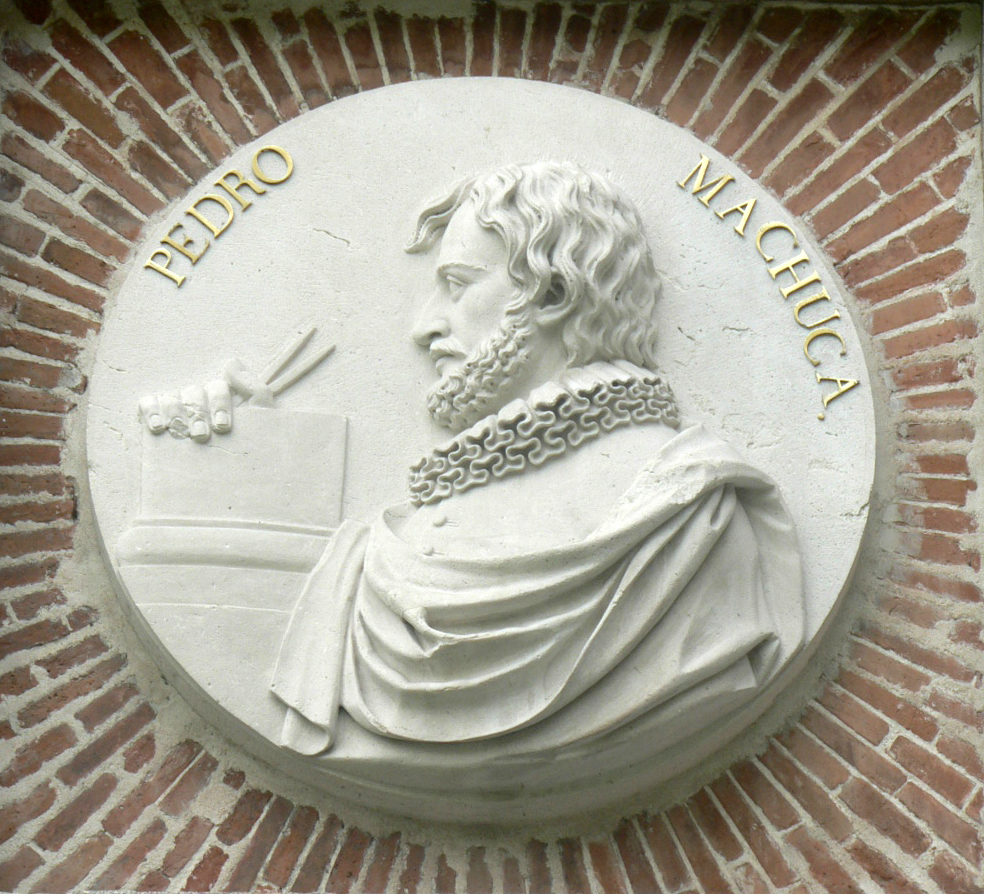
Portrait of Machuca at the Prado Museum

Pedro Machuca (c. 1490 in Toledo, Spain – 1550 in Granada) is mainly remembered as the Spanish architect responsible for the design of the Palace of Charles V (begun 1528) adjacent to the Alcazar in Granada. The significance of this work is that it represents likely the first major classic Renaissance style building in Spain. Culturally, it represents the urge by the conquering Christians to challenge the hegemony of Moorish architecture in the recently (1492) acquired province of Granada.

The details of his life are poorly known. Born in Toledo, he is said to have been a pupil or friends with Michelangelo and Pontormo. Returning to Spain in 1520, he worked as a painter in the Royal Chapel of Granada, as well as in Jaén, Toledo, and Uclés.
