= Dueñas Palace, Medina del Campo =

Palacio de los Dueñas
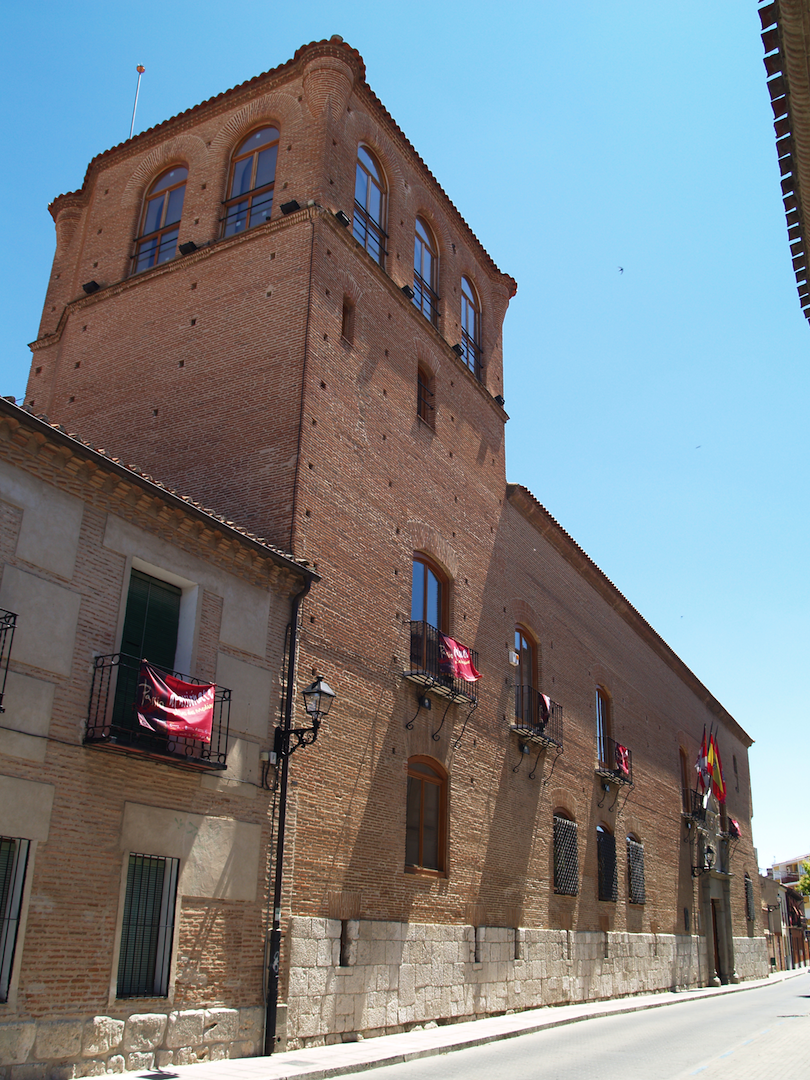
- Facade of the palace
- Interactive map of the Palacio de los Dueñas area

General information
- Type: Palace
- Architectural style: Renaissance
- Location: Medina del Campo, Provincia de Valladolid, Castilla y León, España
- Current tenants: Educational centre
- Construction started: 1528
- Completed: 1543

Design and construction
- Architect: Luis de Vega
- Other designers: Esteban Jamete
- Designations: Asset of Cultural Interest|Asset of Cultural Interest (BIC); June 3, 1931; RI-51-0001002

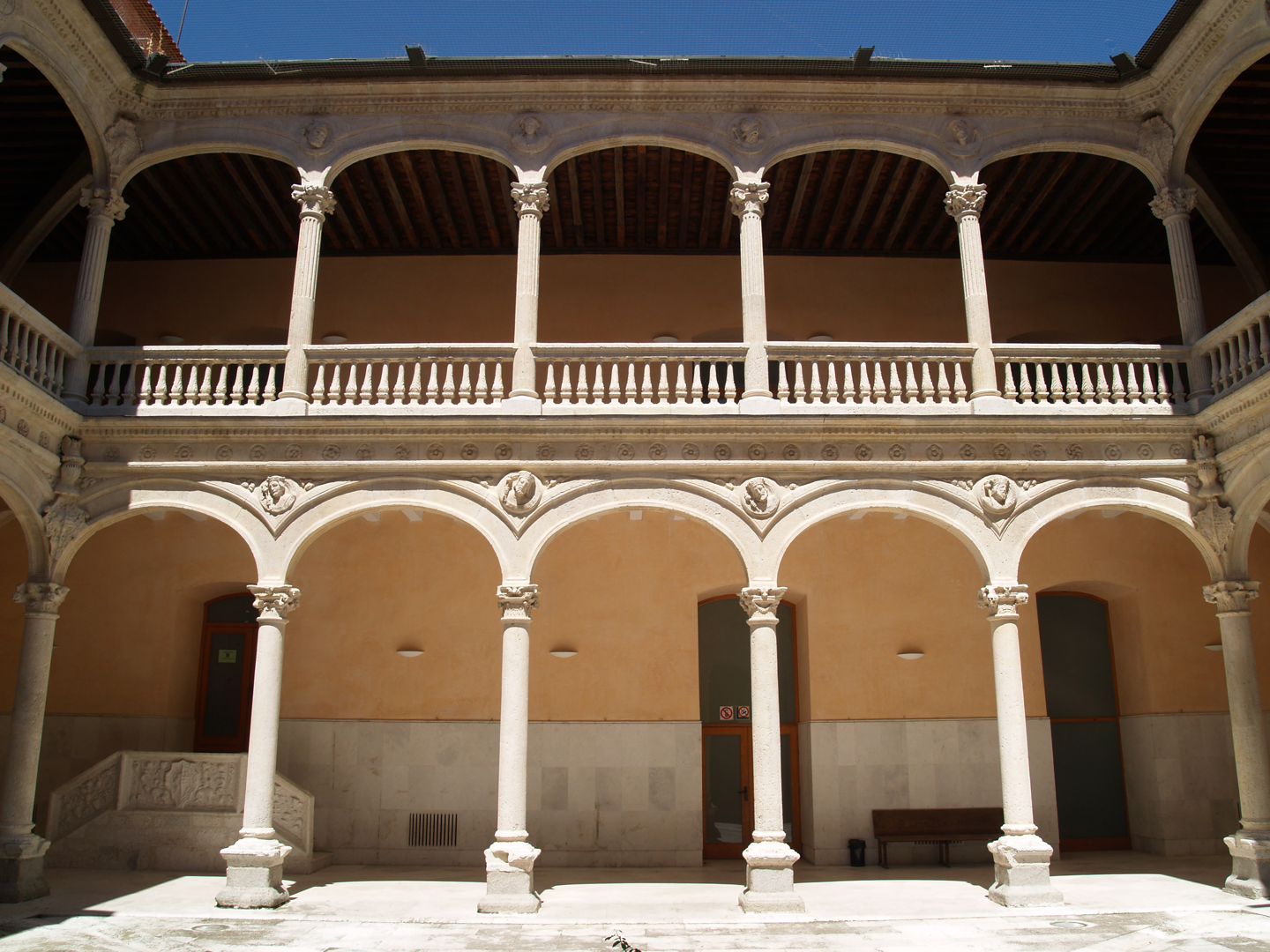
Courtyard of the palace

The Dueñas Palace, Medina del Campo is a Renaissance urban palace located in Medina del Campo. It is the finest example of the noble houses of the town and one of the most notable in the province.

It was declared a National Monument (Asset of Cultural Interest) on June 3, 1931.

== Historical context: Medina in the 16th century ==
In the second half of the 16th century, Medina del Campo thrived on the splendour of its Trade Fairs. Created in the early 15th century by Fernando de Antequera, lord of the town, the vitality of the Castilian economy of the time, the town's location, and the support of the Catholic Monarchs, who elevated them to the status of General Fairs of the Kingdom, led them to be considered among the most important fairs held in Europe. Although initially trade activity was predominantly commercial, in the 16th century financial activities payments and currency exchange came to predominate and gave the fairs their international character. Spanish merchants and financiers gathered in Medina alongside others from Italy, France, and the Low Countries. These fairs were the principal venue where the Royal Treasury negotiated, mainly with European money changers and financiers, its credit needs and corresponding payments.

What set Medina apart from other cities and towns was the importance of merchants, money changers, bankers, lawyers, and other activities that flourished in one of the most important commercial and financial centres of the Iberian Peninsula.

== History ==
Don Diego Beltrán, a hidalgo who had made his fortune in Peru and was a member of the Royal Council of the Indies, returned to Spain and settled in Medina del Campo, where in the mid-1520s he began construction of this noble house on a plot on what was then called Calle de Santiago, inside the city walls but set apart from the fair streets. Its design and execution are attributed to Luis de Vega, the royal architect responsible for the palace he built in Valladolid for Francisco de los Cobos y Molina (Royal Palace) around the same years, which was later extensively remodelled by the Duke of Lerma, and with which it shares similarities.

Upon Don Diego's death the palace passed to his son Ventura and later to his granddaughter Mariana Beltrán, who married Francisco de Dueñas (eldest son of Rodrigo de Dueñas, a prominent banker of the era who served as Treasury Councillor to Charles V), from whom the building takes its name, becoming part of his mayorazgo (entailed estate). The palace remained in the family's possession until 1916, when it was acquired by the Marquesses of Argüeso, who planned to dismantle the courtyard and staircase and transfer them to Madrid a plan that was never carried out.

In 1931 it was declared a National Monument, and in 1950 it was acquired by the state from its then owners, the Dukes of Sueca, and converted into an educational centre, a function it continues to serve today.

== Description ==
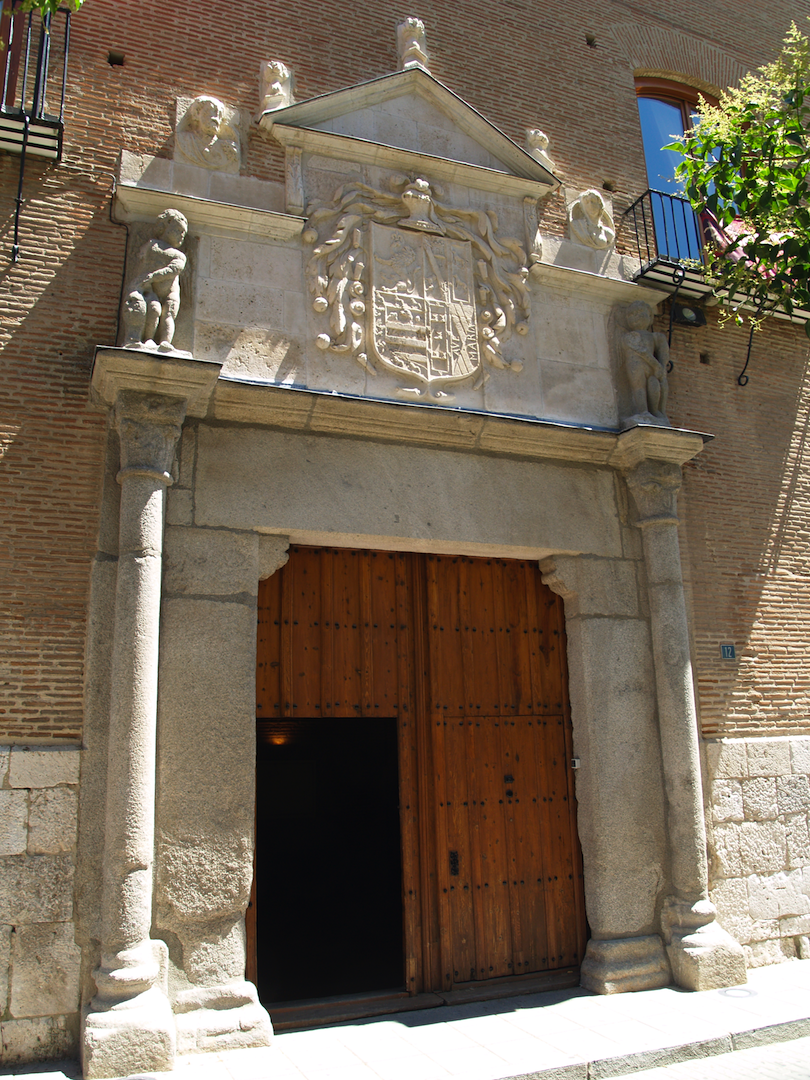
Main doorway of the palace

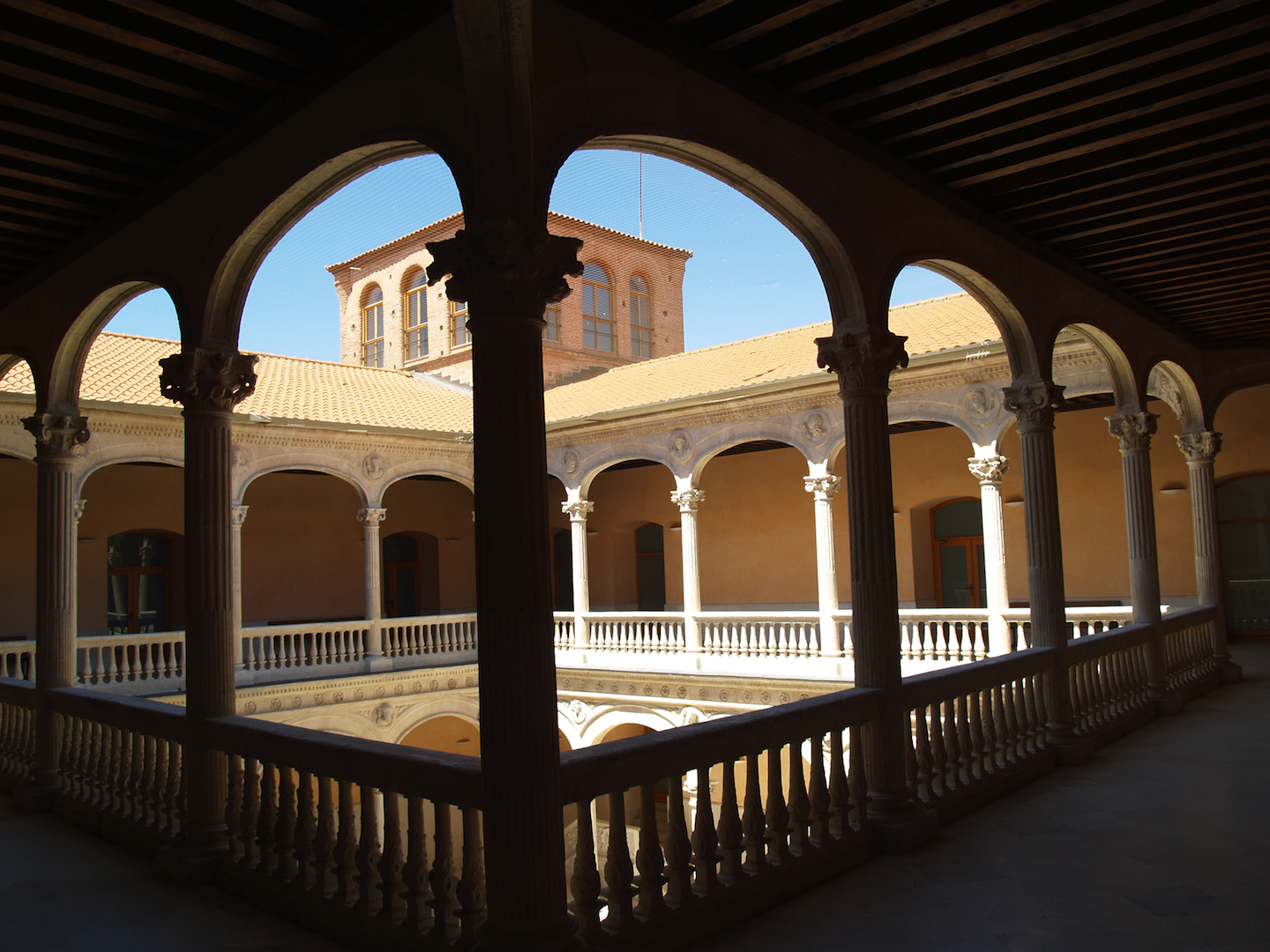
Courtyard of the palace

The building has a square floor plan and two storeys, from one corner of which rises a turret one of the two it once possessed. Its facade is sober, built in brick over a limestone plinth. The ground-floor windows are fitted with lattice-style grilles, while those on the first floor have balconies. The main doorway is the most prominent feature: it is lintelled and flanked by columns supporting an entablature, above which two cherubs flank the Beltrán de Mella coat of arms. The ensemble is crowned by a pediment, with two medallions bearing high-relief busts on either side.

The entrance vestibule is covered by a splendid coffered ceiling of square and hexagonal coffers set between beams, the work of carpenter Francisco de la Fuente, the only one of the several such ceilings the building once had that survives. From the vestibule, through a doorway offset from the main entrance, one enters the courtyard, the most notable part of the palace.

The colonnaded courtyard is rectangular and two storeys high, with columns and depressed arches on the ground floor, and basket-handle arches with balustrades between the fluted columns on the upper floor, with finely carved capitals. In the spandrels of the arches on both floors appear medallions with busts of the kings and queens of Castile, the work of sculptor Esteban Jamete. They depict, in chronological order, the monarchs from Ferdinand I to Philip the Handsome. Eight coats of arms bearing the family's heraldry, placed at the corners of the courtyard, complete the decoration.

A claustral staircase connects the two floors, with a balustrade on which two corner pillars each preserve a small statue. In the opposite gallery a second, smaller staircase survives, with two flights, its parapet carved with the owners' coat of arms and other grotesques.

The remaining rooms of the palace have been greatly altered. Only the room on the upper floor facing the main facade retains part of a frieze with Renaissance decoration. The palace once had a large garden at the rear, of which nothing remained by the 1950s when the classrooms of the educational centre were built.

== See also ==
- Anexo: https://es.wikipedia.org/wiki/Anexo:Edificios_Monumentales_de_Medina_del_Campo

== Bibliography ==
  - Sánchez del Barrio, Antonio (1996). Medina del Campo: la villa de las Ferias. ISBN 978-84-8183-026-2.
  - Fernández del Hoyo, María Antonia; Urrea, Jesús (2002). Casas y palacios de Castilla y León. ISBN 978-84-9718-090-0.
  - Árias Martínez, Manuel; Hernández Redondo, José Ignacio y Sánchez del Barrio, Antonio (2004). Medina del Campo.
