= Luis de Vega =

Spanish architect

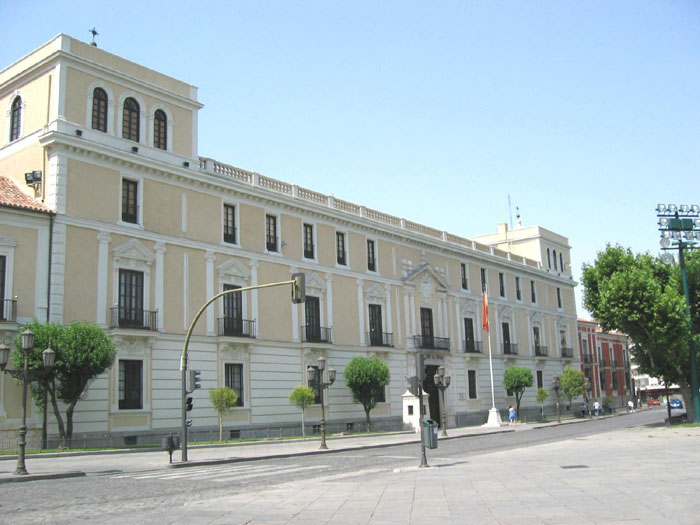
The Valladolid Royal Palace is amongst the works of architect Luis de Vega. At the end of the 16th century, the Francisco de los Cobos Palace was enlarged and refurbished and was sold to the King Philip III.

Luis de Vega (? - 10 November 1562) was a 16th-century Spanish architect appointed royal architect of Charles I.

== Life ==
In 1518 to find Luis de Vega settled in Torrelaguna to take care of the construction of some houses owned by the university. By 1520 he had moved to Madrid. In the mid-twenties he did work in Valladolid for Don Francisco de los Cobos y Molina, the imperial secretary.

In 1531 he became a teacher at the Colegio Mayor de San Ildefonso, a position he held until his death. That same year Cobos sent him to Úbeda, where Cobos had commissioned some building work. In 1537 he managed the administration regarding the facade work on the college by Rodrigo Gil de Hontañón.

He renovated the old Alcazar of Madrid. Construction started in 1537. Also is 1537, Vega built a manor house, the Palacio de Dueñas, in Medina del Campo for Dr. Beltrán, friend of Cobos. In December 1537, Vega and Alonso de Covarrubias were appointed to be in charge of the expansion, reconstruction and reform of the fortresses of Madrid, Toledo and Seville, with the obligation that each of the masters reside alternately for six months in them.

In 1538, the Emperor sent Vega to Madrid to review the plans for the palace Charles was having built at the Alhambra. While there he directed the construction of the chapel of the bishop of Calahorra, Don Alonso de Castilla Zúniga in the Madrid convent of Santo Domingo, including a new porch.

In 1540 he designed the upper story of the "Patio de las Doncellas" (Courtyard of the Maidens) in the Alcázar of Seville. The addition was designed in the style of the Italian Renaissance although Vega did include both Renaissance and mudéjar plaster work in the decorations. In 1542, he transformed the pavilion on mount El Pardo, into what is now the Royal Palace of El Pardo. Vega transformed the small hunting lodge into a traditional alcázar with a moat. In 1545, he designed a plan for the Hospital de la Sangre in Seville.

With his nephew, the architect Gaspar de Vega, he worked on the vanished Palace of Valsain. They also designed the plans for the Convento de San Felipe el Real in Madrid (1545). In 1547 he designed the Torre de la Parada, a hunting lodge near the Royal Palace of El Pardo. In 1550 Vega was in Aranjuez overseeing the rebuilding of the dam that the river had carried away. In July he looked to the repairs in the Forest of Segovia hunting ground.

He also worked on a number of manor houses including the Francisco de los Cobos Palace in Valladolid (the Valladolid Royal Palace).

Luis de Vega died in Madrid on 10 November 1562.

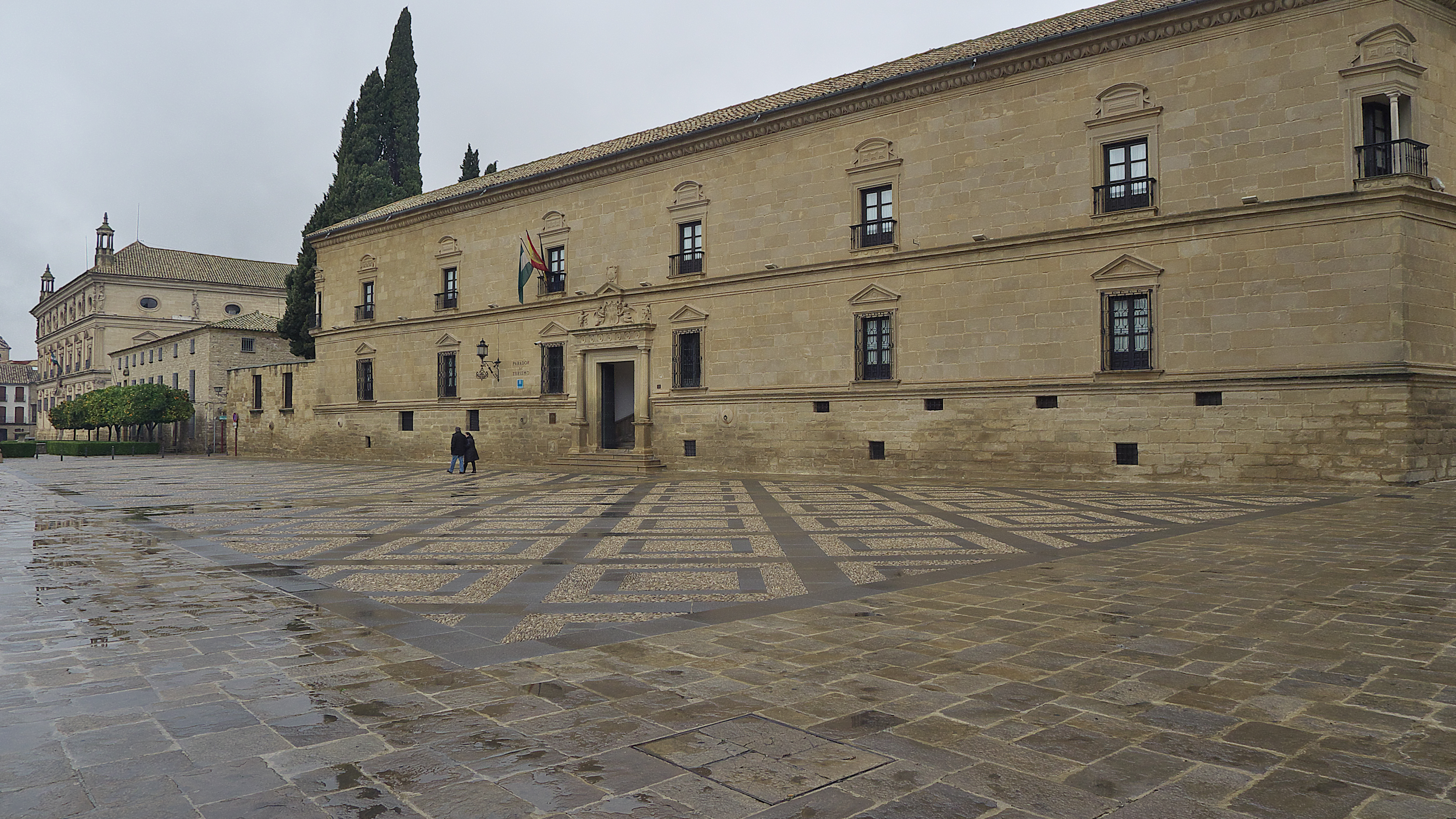
Palacio del Deán Ortega (Úbeda)

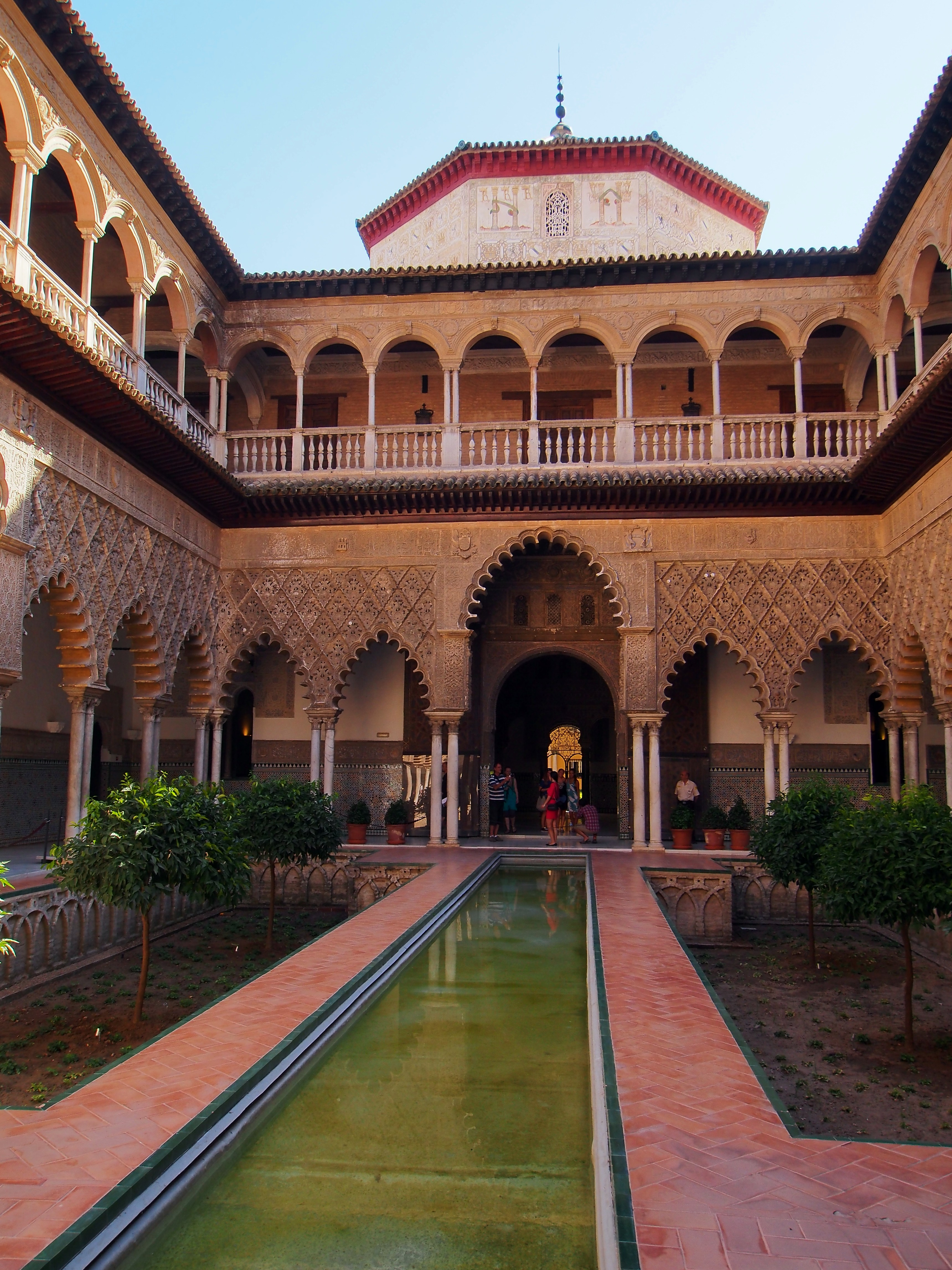
Courtyard of the Maidens, Alcázar of Seville

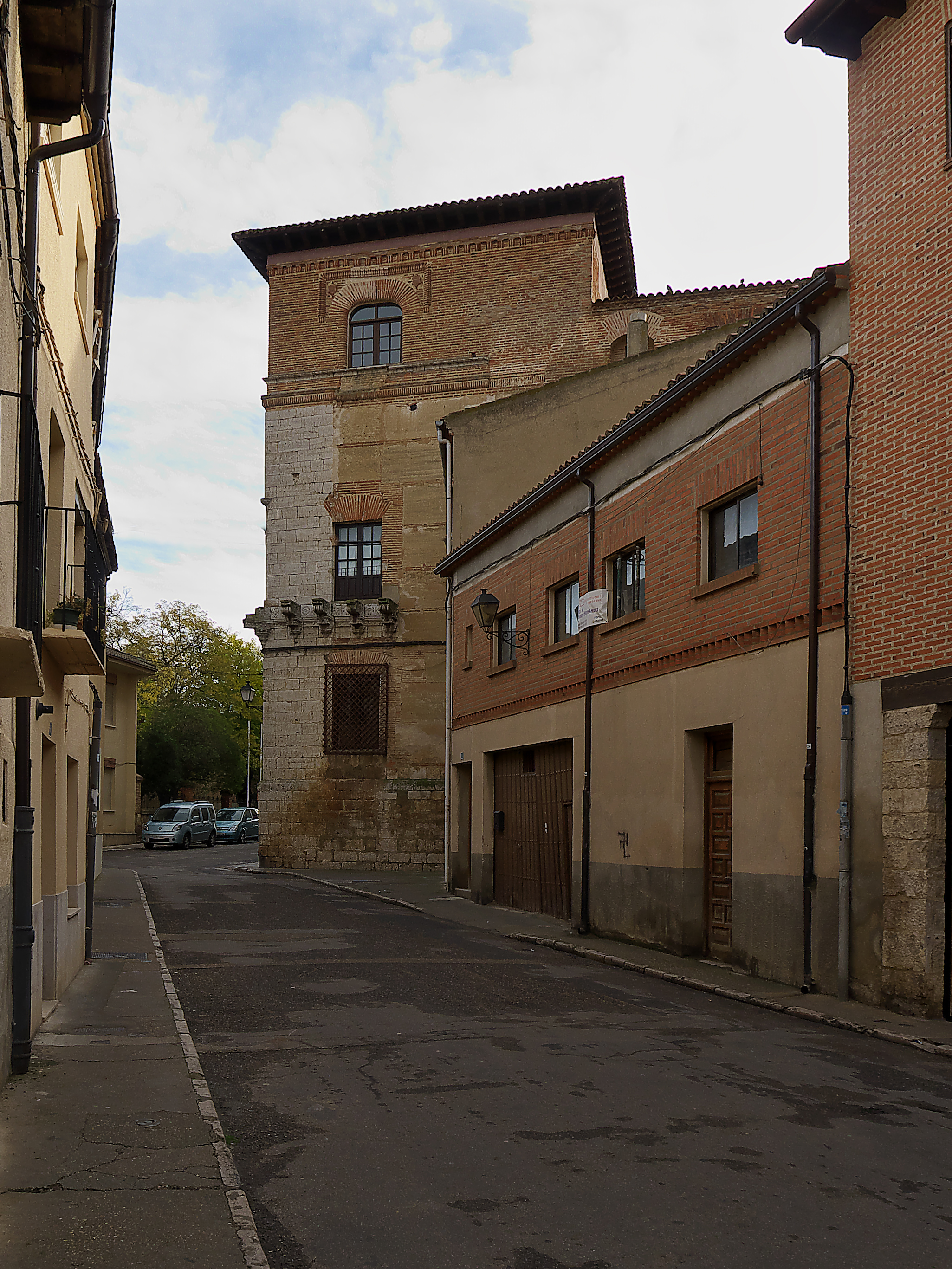
Palacio de los Marqueses de Alcañices, Toro
