= Úbeda =

- Municipality
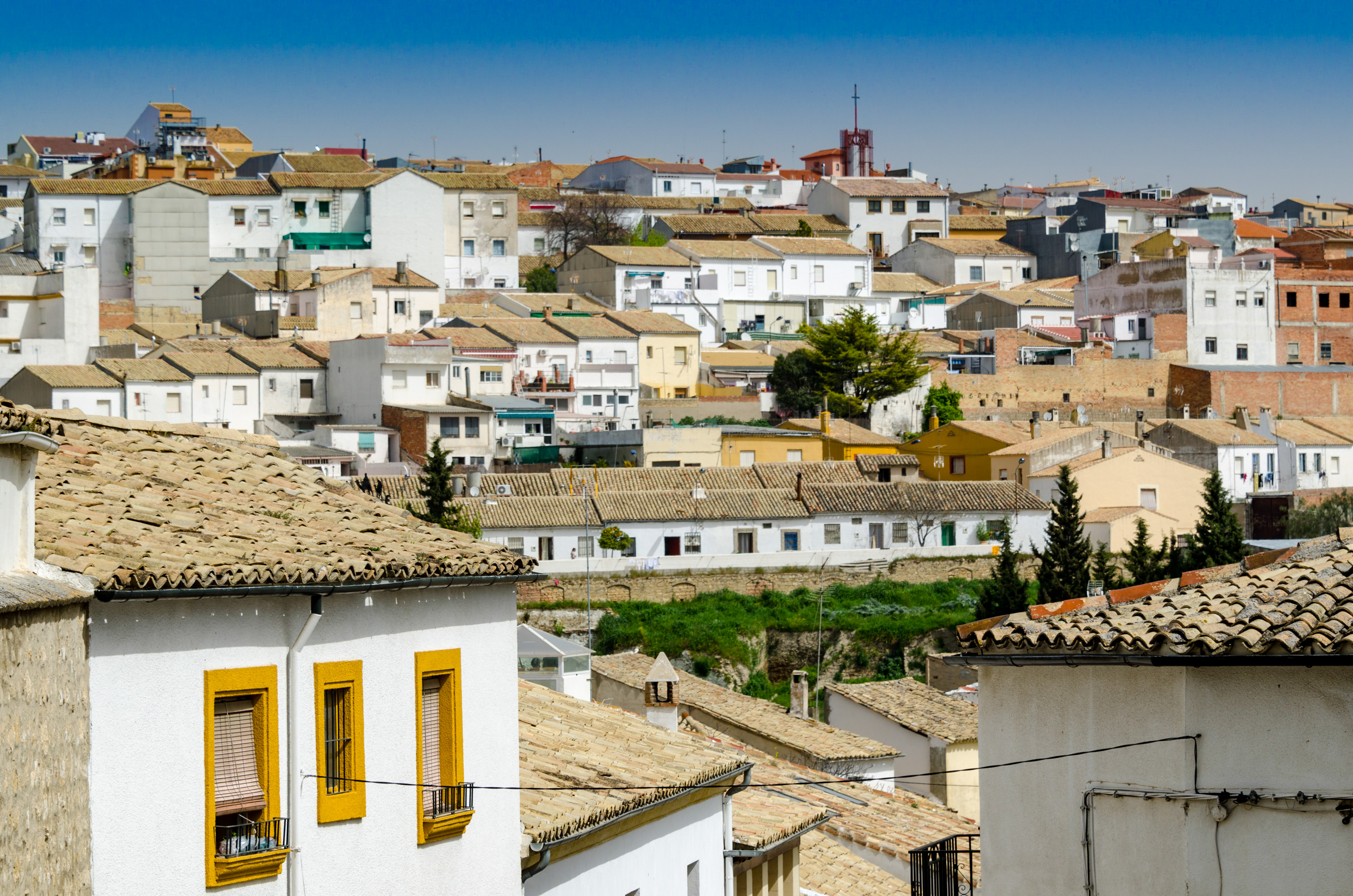
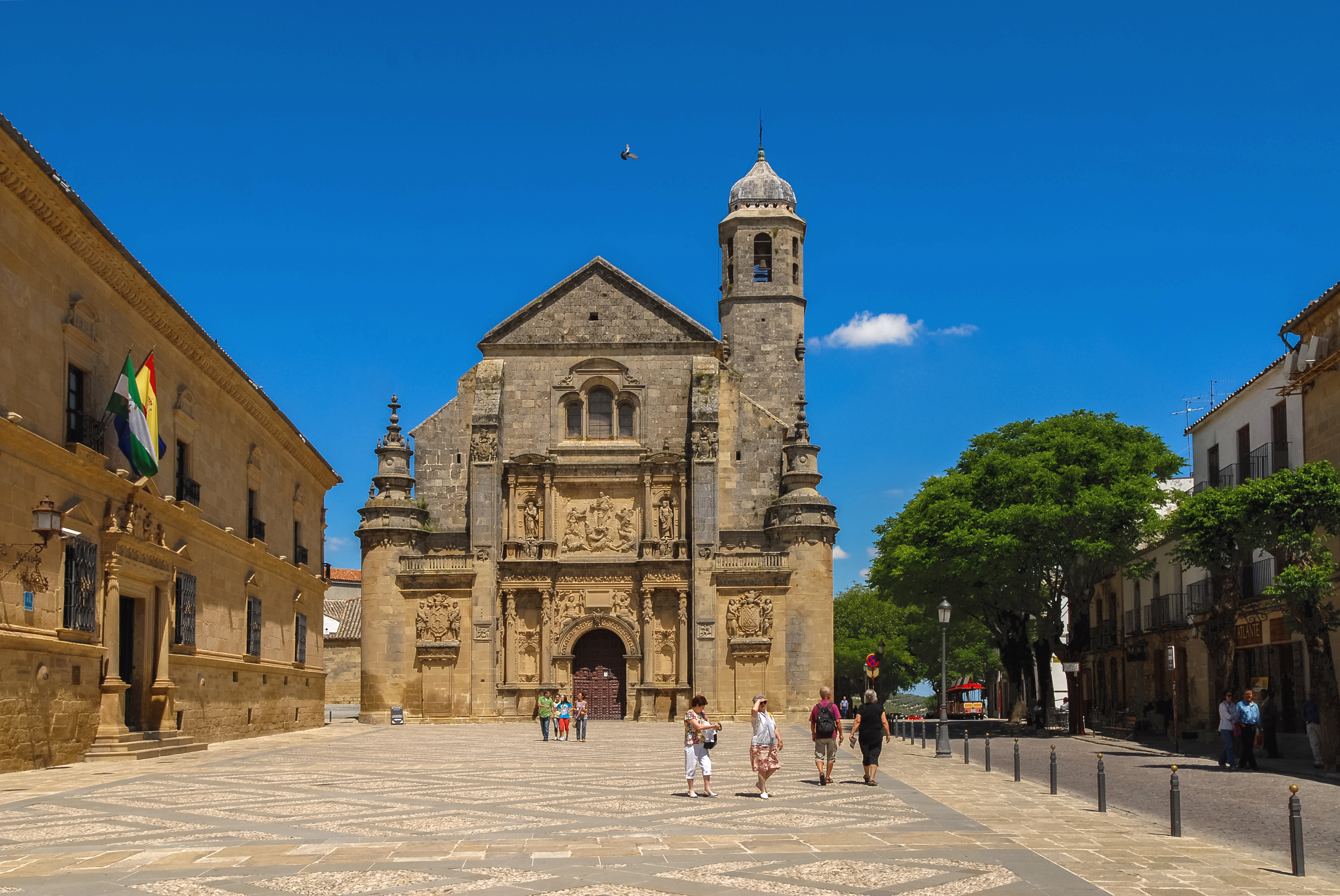
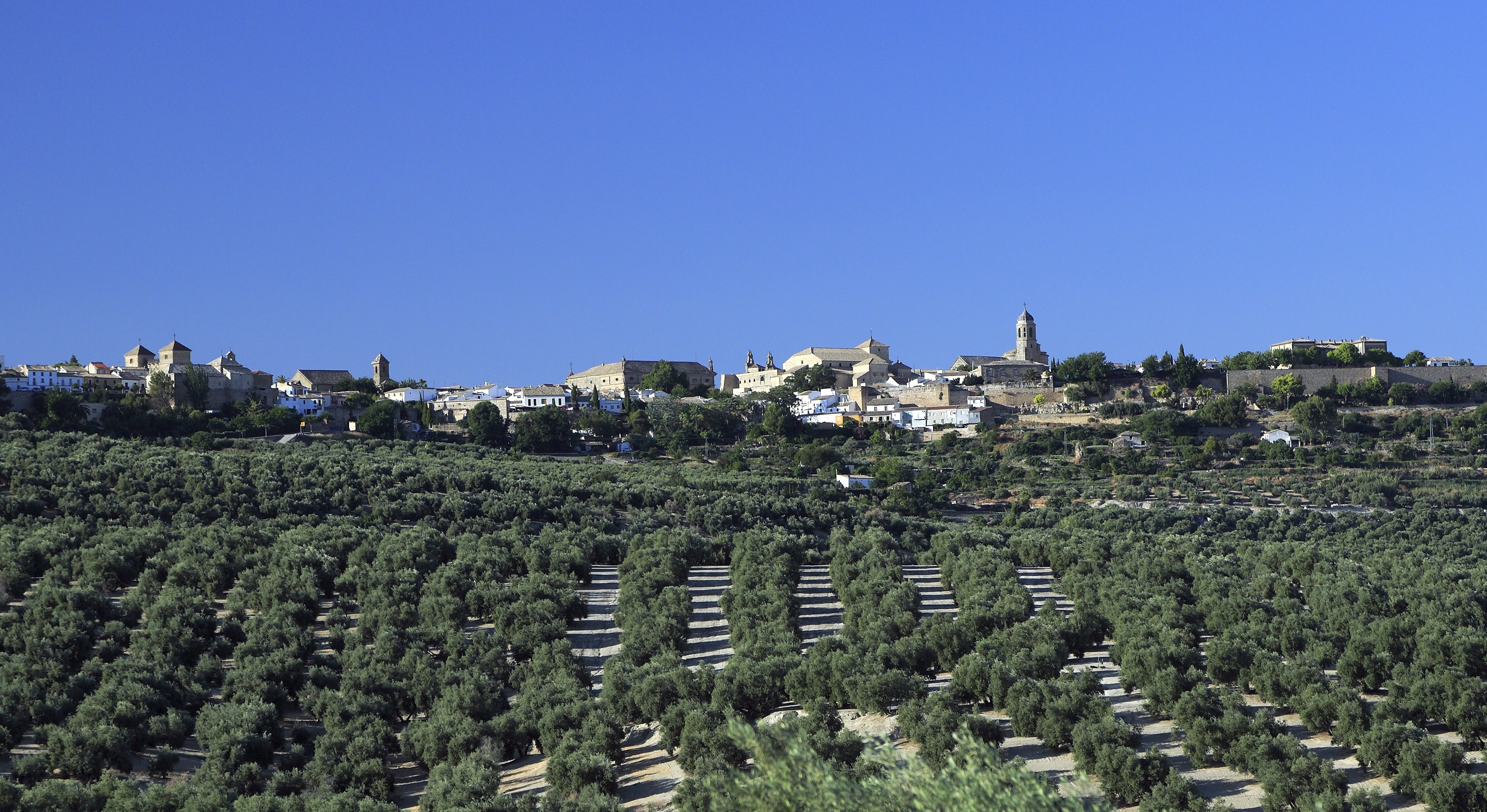

- Flag Coat of arms
- Location of Úbeda
- Coordinates: 38°0′50.84″N 3°22′20.81″W
- Country: Spain
- Autonomous community: Andalusia
- Province: Jaén

Government
  - Mayor: Antonia Olivares Martínez (PSOE)

Area
  - Total: 397.1 km^{2} (153.3 sq mi)
- Elevation: 748 m (2,454 ft)

Population (2025-01-01)
  - Total: 33,588
  - Density: 84.58/km^{2} (219.1/sq mi)
- Demonym: Ubetenses
- Time zone: UTC+1 (CET)
  - Summer (DST): UTC+2 (CEST)
- Postal code: 23400
- Website: Official website

UNESCO World Heritage Site
- Part of: Renaissance Monumental Ensembles of Úbeda and Baeza
- Criteria: Cultural: (ii)(iv)
- Reference: 522
- Inscription: 2003 (27th Session)
- Area: 4.2 ha (10 acres)
- Buffer zone: 90.3 ha (223 acres)

Úbeda (Spanish pronunciation: [ˈuβeða]) is a municipality of Spain located in the province of Jaén, Andalusia. The town lies on the southern ridge of the so-called Loma de Úbeda, a table sandwiched in between the Guadalquivir and the Guadalimar river beds.

Both this town and the neighbouring Baeza benefited from extensive patronage in the early 16th century resulting in the construction of a series of Renaissance style palaces and churches, which have been preserved ever since. In 2003, UNESCO declared the historic centres and landmarks of these two towns a World Heritage Site. As of 2017, the municipality has a registered population of 34,733, ranking it as the fourth most populated municipality in the province.

== History ==
=== Prehistory ===
Legend has it that Úbeda was established by Tubal, a descendant of Noah. The city's name is said to have originated from the mythical tower of King Ibiut.

Archaeological evidence indicates the earliest settlements in Úbeda going back to the Copper Age, and are situated in the oldest part of town known as Cerro del Alcázar. Recent archaeological investigations have revealed a history spanning six millennia; thus, Úbeda stands as the "oldest city, scientifically substantiated, in Western Europe". This assertion comes from the research team led by Professor Francisco Nocete, based on findings from 35 Carbon-14 datings conducted at the Las Eras del Alcázar site.

=== Protohistory, Roman and post-Roman era ===
There are remnants from the Chalcolithic, Argaric, Oretanian, Visigothic, and Late Roman periods in the Alcázar. There was a sistering Iberian settlement nearby called Iltiraka, later incorporated into the Roman colony of Salaria and was known as Old Úbeda or Ubeda Vethula. Greeks arrived in Úbeda seeking trade, followed by the Carthaginians with imperialist aims, but both were defeated by the Romans after prolonged conflicts.

During the Roman Empire, following the Battle of Ilipa in 206 BCE, the ancient Iberian city-state underwent Romanization, becoming known as Betula. It became a hub for various scattered populations. In the Gothic era, the Vandals destroyed the region, leading the inhabitants to consolidate in what is now known as Bétula Nova, though the reasons for this are unclear.

=== 11th-13th century ===
The city regained significance with the arrival of the Arabs, notably under Abderramán II, who reestablished it as Ubbada or Ubbadat Al-Arab — Úbeda "of the Arabs" —, aiming to control the neighboring Mozarabs of Baeza. In the 11th century, it was contested among the taifa kingdoms of Almería, Granada, Toledo, and Seville until its eventual conquest by the Almoravids. As a Muslim city, it expanded its defensive walls and flourished as one of Al-Andalus' most important centers due to its thriving craftsmanship and trade. Thus, it became a prosperous and strategic stronghold.

During the year 1091, Úbeda was forcibly surrendered to Alfonso VI by the king of Toledo amidst internal rebellion among the Andalusian Moors. Throughout the 12th century, Castilian kings intensified pressure on the region, leading to Úbeda being mentioned in historical records primarily for its involvement in military conflicts. The city experienced significant devastation and changes of control, including a massacre by crusaders in 1212, following the Battle of Las Navas de Tolosa.

During the Reconquista, King Ferdinand III took the city as a part of the Kingdom of Castile, in 1233 - or Úbeda capitulated on May 8, 1234. Úbeda's territories increased substantially, including the area from Torres de Acún (Granada) to Santisteban del Puerto, passing by cities like Albánchez de Úbeda, Huesa and Canena, and in the middle of the 16th century it also included Cabra del Santo Cristo, Quesada or Torreperogil.

Lorite Cruz dates the recently discovered Sinagoga del Agua from the 13th century.

=== 14th-15th century ===
During the 14th and the 15th centuries, conflicts between the local nobility and population impaired the growth of the town. In 1368, the city was damaged during the Castilian Civil War between Peter I of Castile and Henry II of Castile. This, combined with other circumstances, caused the worsening of the rivalry between the families de Trapera and de Aranda at first, and the families de la Cueva and de Molina after. This political instability was solved when the Catholic Monarchs ruled: they ordered that the Alcázar, used by the nobility as a fortress, be destroyed.

Úbeda, on the border between Granada and Castile-La Mancha, was an important geographic buffer, and thus the population gained from the Castilian kings a number of official privileges, such as the "Fuero de Cuenca", which organized the population formed by people from Castilla and from León, in order to face the problems that could arise at the borders. Through the "Fuero de Cuenca", a popular Council was formed, which developed a middle-class nobility and made the high-ranking official hereditary.

=== 16th-18th century ===
During the 16th century, these important Castilian aristocratic families from Úbeda reached top positions in the Spanish Monarchy administration. Notably, Francisco de los Cobos and his nephew Juan Vázquez de Molina became Secretary of State for Holy Roman Emperor Charles V and Philip II respectively. The Viceroy of Peru Pedro de Toledo, the governor of the Canary Islands Juan de Rivera y Zambrana, the Marquis of Messia or the Count of Guadiana are other examples of nobiliary families living in Úbeda at the time. Due to the patronage of arts of these competing families, Úbeda became a Renaissance focus in Spain and from there Renaissance architecture spread to the Kingdom of Seville and America.

The Holy Chapel of the Saviour and Vazquez de Molina Palace, today the Council Town, were designed by the architects Diego de Siloé, Berruguete, and Andrés de Vandelvira, among others. This thriving period ended because of the 17th crisis. The last years of the 18th century, the town started to recover its economy, with the help of the agriculture and handmade industries.

=== 19th century ===
In the early 19th century the War of Independence (this war against Napoleon is often called the "Peninsular War" in English) produced huge economic losses again, and the city did not boost until the end of the 19th century, when several technical improvements were applied in agriculture an industry. Ideological discussions took place at the "casinos", places for informal discussions about several items.

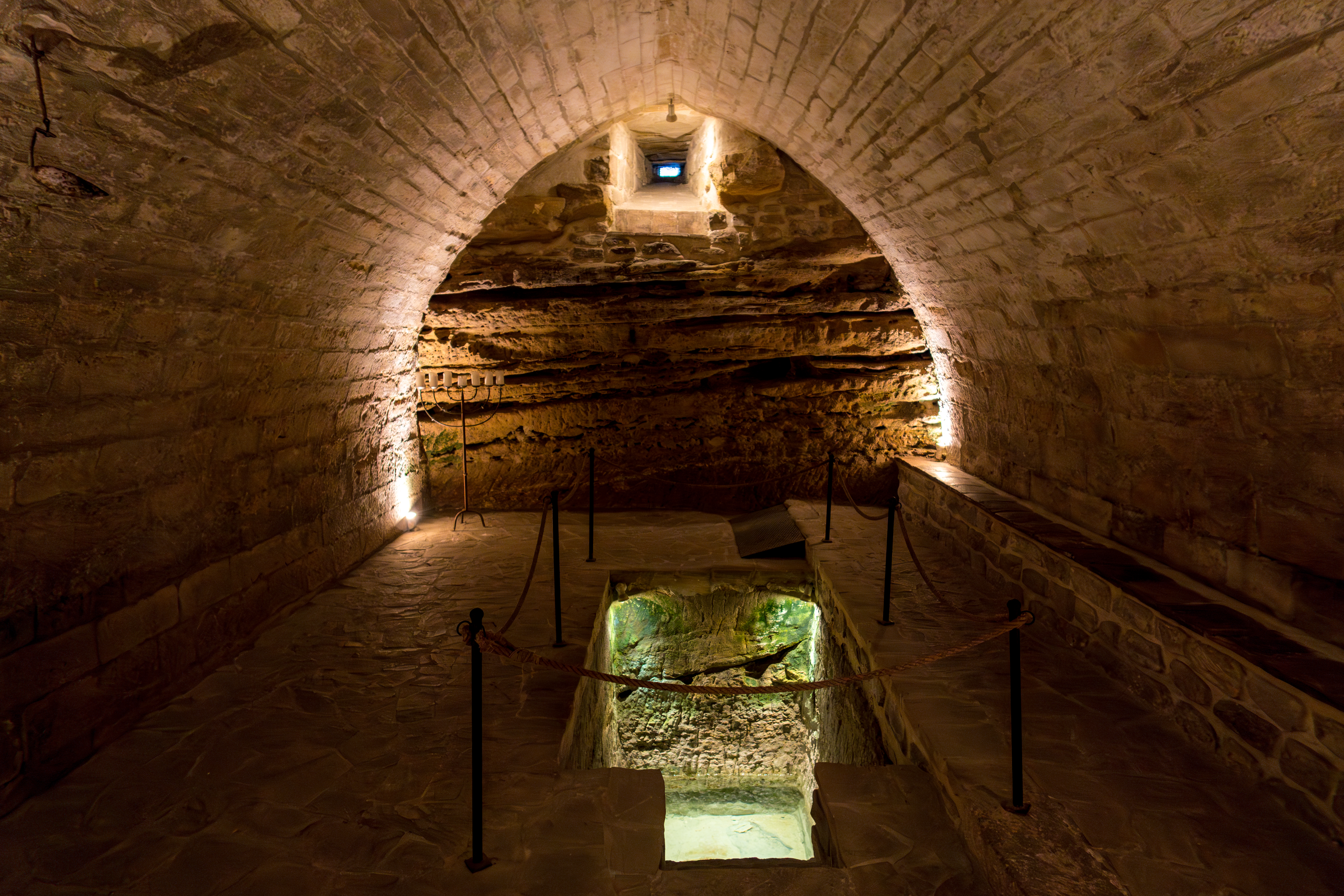
The excavated Water Synagogue.

Historically, a Jewish community thrived in Úbeda during medieval times, until the expulsion of the Jews. In 2007, the remains of a synagogue dating to the 13th century were uncovered in Úbeda's historic city center. Named "Sinagoga del Agua", or "Water Synagogue" because of the seven wells and the mikveh, or Jewish ritual bath, that were found. The Water Synagogue consists of a mikveh, a synagogue room with a women's gallery, a patio with a Jewish tree of life design, and a cellar used to store olive oil and kosher wine.

== Economy ==
The city is near the geographic centre of the province of Jaén, and it is the administrative seat of the surrounding Loma de Úbeda comarca. It is one of the region's most important settlements, boasting a regional hospital, university bachelor's degree in education college, distance-learning facilities, local government facilities, social security offices, and courts. According to the Caixa yearbook, it is the economic hub of a catchment area with a population of 200,000 inhabitants. Twenty-nine percent of employment is in the service sector. Other fractions of the population are employed in tourism, commerce, industry, and local government administration. The agricultural economy mainly works with olive cultivation and cattle ranching. Úbeda has become in one of the biggest olive oil's producers and packers of the Jaén province.

One of the main seasonal attractions of the town is the annual music and dance festival which is held in May and June including opera, jazz, flamenco, chamber music, symphony orchestra and dance. Just southeast of the town lies the nature park of Sierra de Cazorla, Segura y las Villas.

== Main sights ==
The most outstanding feature of the city is the monumental Vázquez de Molina Square, surrounded with imposing Renaissance buildings such as the Palacio de las Cadenas (so named for the decorative chains which once hung from the façade) and the Basílica de Santa María de los Reales Alcázares. The Chapel of the Savior or Capilla del Salvador was constructed to house the tombs of local nobility. Both the interior and exterior are decorated; for example, the interior has elaborate metalwork screen by the ironworker Bartolomé de Jaen. The Hospital de Santiago, designed by Vandelvira in the late 16th century, with its square bell towers and graceful Renaissance courtyard, is now the home of the town's Conference Hall. Úbeda has a Parador hotel, the Parador de Úbeda, housed in a 16th-century palace which was the residence of a high-ranking churchman of that period.

The town lends its name to a common idiom in Spanish, andar por los cerros de Úbeda (literally 'to walk around the hills of Úbeda'), meaning 'to go off at a tangent'.

The city possesses 48 monuments, and more than a hundred other buildings of interest, almost all of them of Renaissance style. All this patrimony led Úbeda to being the second city of renowned Spain Historical – artistic Set, in the year 1955. In the year 1975 it received the appointment of the Council of Europe as Exemplary City of the Renaissance. Finally, in 2003 it was named a World Heritage Site, together with Baeza, by UNESCO.

One of the old gates, the Puerta de Sabiote, an old gate with a horseshoe arch and set in an angle of the old wall, recalls the primitive Moorish town.

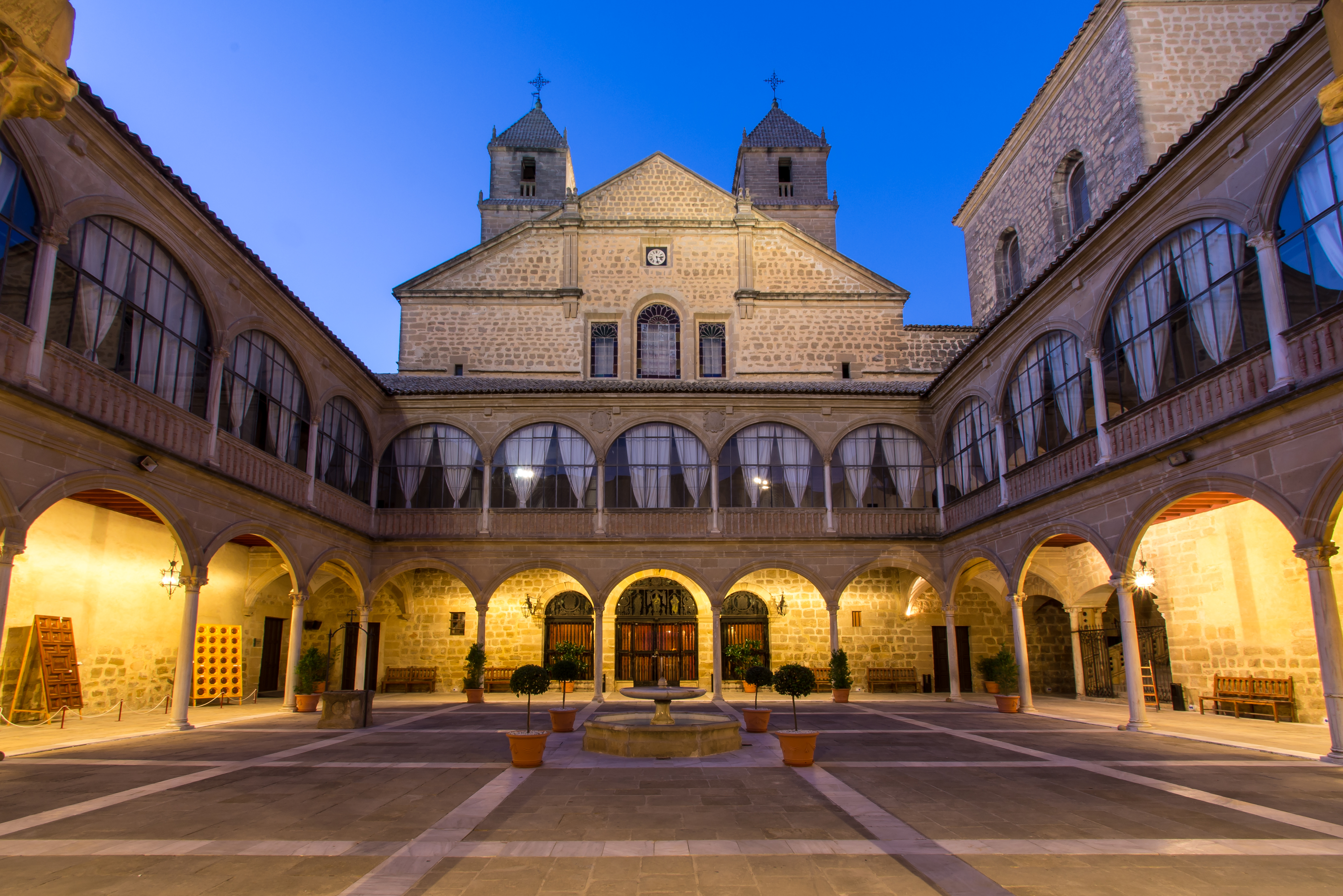
Hospital de Santiago

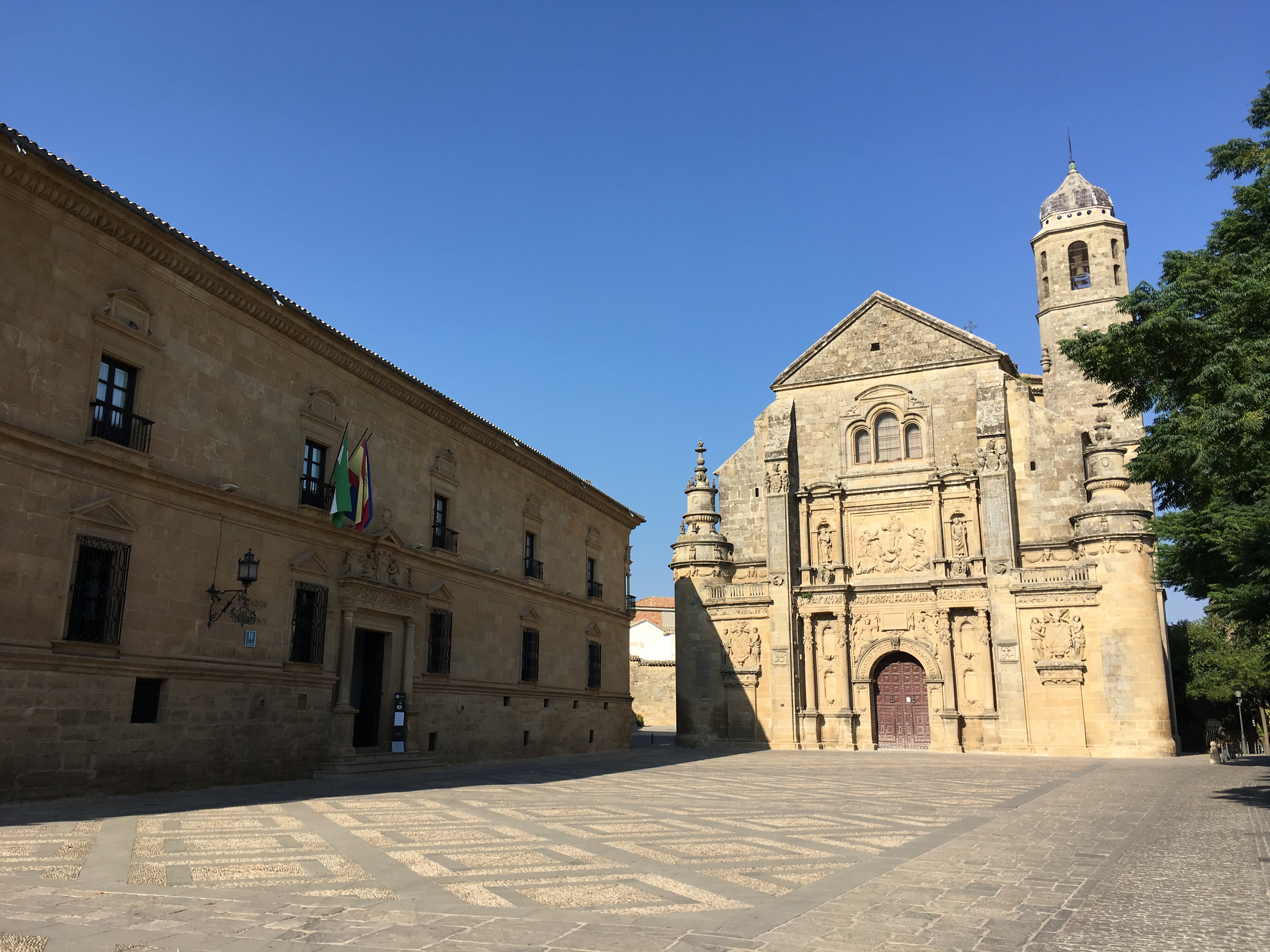
El Salvador Chapel and Dean Ortega's Palace

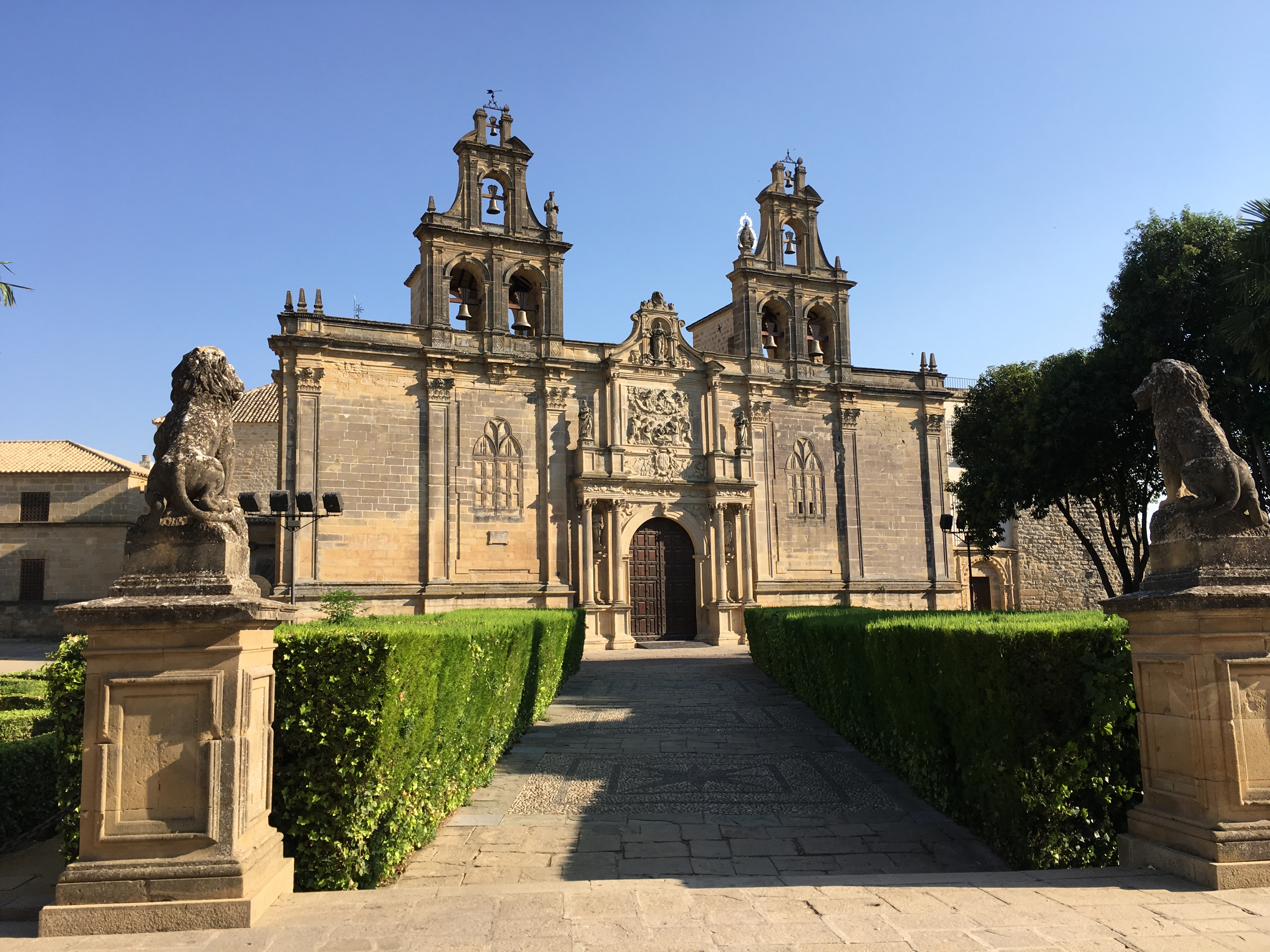
Basílica de Santa María de los Reales Alcázares

== Sister cities ==
- Chiclana de la Frontera, Spain.
- Lège-Cap-Ferret, France.

== People ==
- Ruy López Dávalos Count of Ribadeo since it was sold by the first count, the Frenchman Pierre de Villaines, who received it from Henry II of Castile on 20 December 1369, Adelantado of Murcia, 1396, Constable of Castile, 1400–1423, during the reigns of kings Henry III of Castile and John II of Castile.
- Beltrán de la Cueva, 1st Duke of Alburquerque,nobleman who is said to have fathered Joan, the daughter of Henry IV of Castile wife Joan of Portugal.
- Francisco de los Cobos, Charles the Fifth's Secretary of State.
- Diego de los Cobos Molina, Roman Catholic prelate who served as Bishop of Jaén (1560–1565) and Bishop of Ávila (1559–1560).
- Arsenio Moreno Mendoza was a Spanish writer, academic, and politician.
- Joaquín Sabina, writer, poet and singer.
- Antonio Muñoz Molina, writer who won Prince of Asturias Award of literature category.
- Saint John of The Cross, mystic poet.
- Zahara (Spanish Musician), singer-songwriter.
- Carlos Muñoz (footballer, born 1961), former professional football player.
- José Luis Villacañas, political philosopher and historian of politic ideas.
- Juan Pizarro Navarrete, physician and politician.
- David Uclés, novelist

== See also ==
- List of municipalities in Jaén
