= Convento de San Felipe el Real =

Convent in Madrid, Spain

Coordinates: 40°24′59.09″N 3°42′18.04″W

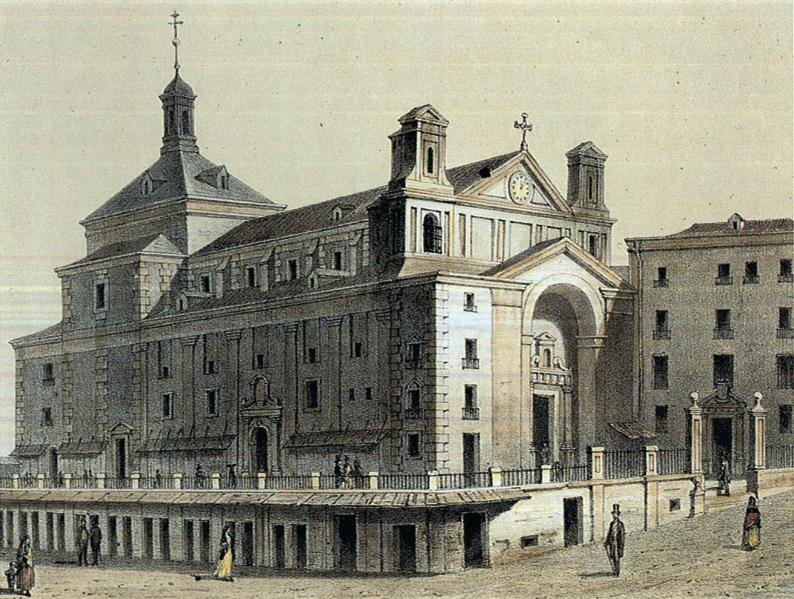
The Convento de San Felipe el Real in a woodcut of 1878.

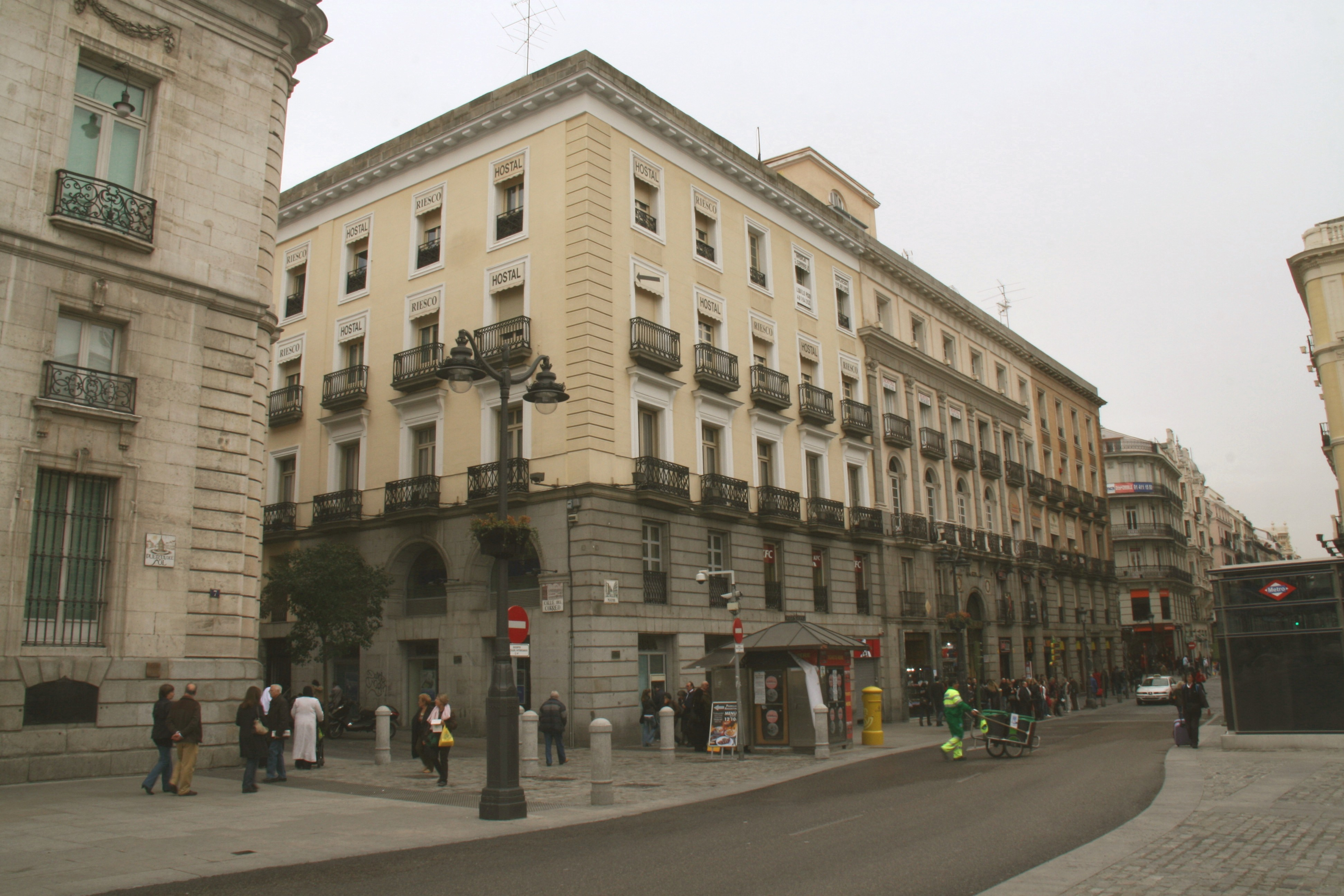
Now in its site is Casa Cordero, that is the first apartment building built in the city.

The now-defunct Convento de San Felipe el Real (English: Convent of Saint Philip the Royal; briefly called as San Felipe el Real) was a former Madrilenian convent of Calced Augustinian monks, located at the beginning of Calle Mayor in Madrid, next to the Puerta del Sol. Built between 16th and 17th centuries, was rise on a large pedestal (with protected perimeter of railings), was part of it a famous talking shop of the city (the Steps of San Felipe). One of its famous guests was Friar Luis de León. It was opposite the Palacio de Oñate.

== History ==
The beginning of the convent can be traced to 1539 when Francisco Osorio proposed to the City Council of Madrid the creation of a Convent of Calced Augustinian. Archbishop of Toledo, Don Juan Martínez Silíceo, refused alleging that in Madrid in that moment had two monasteries of mendicant friars: that of San Francisco and that of Nuestra Señora de Atocha. However the Archbishop of Toledo had to cede to the pleas of people coming to royalty such as Prince Philip II, Maria of Aragon, aunt of Charles V, Holy Roman Emperor and Prioress of the Augustinian Convent of Nuestra Señora de Gracia de Madrigal de las Altas Torres, or Leonor de Mascareñas.

The Augustinian convent of San Felipe el Real was founded in 1547 by bull of Pope Paul III of June 20. The temple was dedicated to Saint Philip the Apostle as was Prince Philip II a great devotee of him. For its construction was used part of a site owned by Count of Orgaz located near the wide street of Puerta del Sol (as it was called to the Puerta), which ceded to the Order in exchange for a chapel. On the axis of the current calle de Esparteros was the entrance to the convent. At first it built a wooden chapel, inaugurated on March 14 of 1545. The church was carried out according to Plans of Luis and Gaspar de Vega. To save the uneven ground the building was mounted on a platform or "lonja", underneath which a number of locals or "covachuelas" were stablished serving as markets. This space around the convent had been ceded by the City Council of Madrid under the condition of being clear and not be used for any purpose other than the public.

On August 22, 1622 was murdered Juan de Tassis y Peralta Count of Villamediana in the door of the neighboring Palacio de Oñate.

The church suffered a fire in 1718 and, during the French Napoleonic Invasion the whole was very mistreated. After the Confiscation of Mendizábal was demolished in 1838 to widen Calle Mayor and, instead, the first apartment building in the city was built, the Casa Cordero (1842-1845).

=== Steps of San Felipe ===
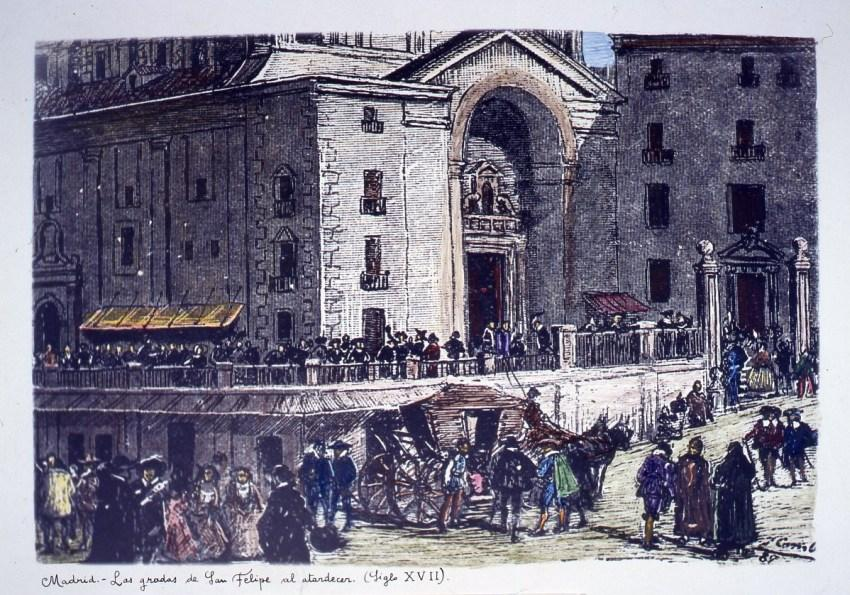
The steps of San Felipe, crowded in a picture of 17th century.

During 16th century the convent had a strong walls to isolate the convent life outside the bustle of the Puerta del Sol. The construction of the facade by architect Juan Gutiérrez Toribio led a step surface that was called Lonja de San Felipe. Gathered the Madrid's inhabitants in this area to exchange news, rumors, calumnies, inventions, secrets and opinions. For this reason it was called "mentidero" of Madrid. The steps of San Felipe (Las Gradas de San Felipe) was also a gathering place to recruit soldiers destined to the Spanish Netherlands during the War of Flanders. One day, due to the weight caused by the crush of people gathered on it to witness the prison of a reprobate, the balcony of the lonja sank. The accident caused many deaths and injuries.

== Features ==
Its Renaissance cloister was considered one of the best in the city and the Court. A part of the known lonja with the steps that was called el mentidero, San Felipe el Real had under its floor a galleries called covachuelas that were marketplaces of different goods of various kinds, including toys and books.
