= Royal Palace of Valladolid =

Coordinates: 41.6564°N 4.7258°W

- Palacio Real de Valladolid
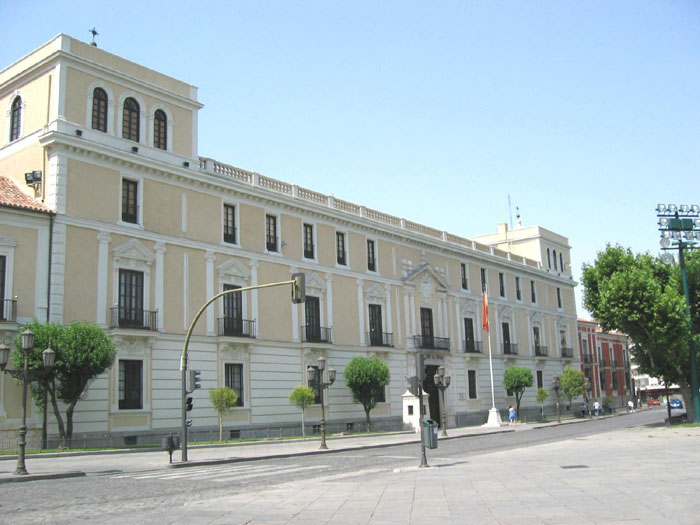
- Royal Palace of Valladolid
- Interactive map of the Royal Palace of Valladolid area

General information
- Architectural style: Renaissance
- Location: Valladolid, Castile and León, Spain
- Construction started: Early 16th century
- Client: Charles V, Holy Roman Emperor; Philip II of Spain; Philip III of Spain; Napoleon

Spanish Cultural Heritage
- Official name: Palacio Real de Valladolid
- Criteria: Monument
- Designated: 06-18-1999
- Reference no.: RI-51-0010470

The Royal Palace of Valladolid was the official residence of the kings of Spain during the period in which the royal court had its seat in Valladolid between 1601 and 1606, and a temporary residence of the Spanish monarchs from Charles I to Isabella II, as well as of Napoleon during the Peninsular War. Currently it is the headquarters of the 4th General Sub-inspection of the Spanish Army.

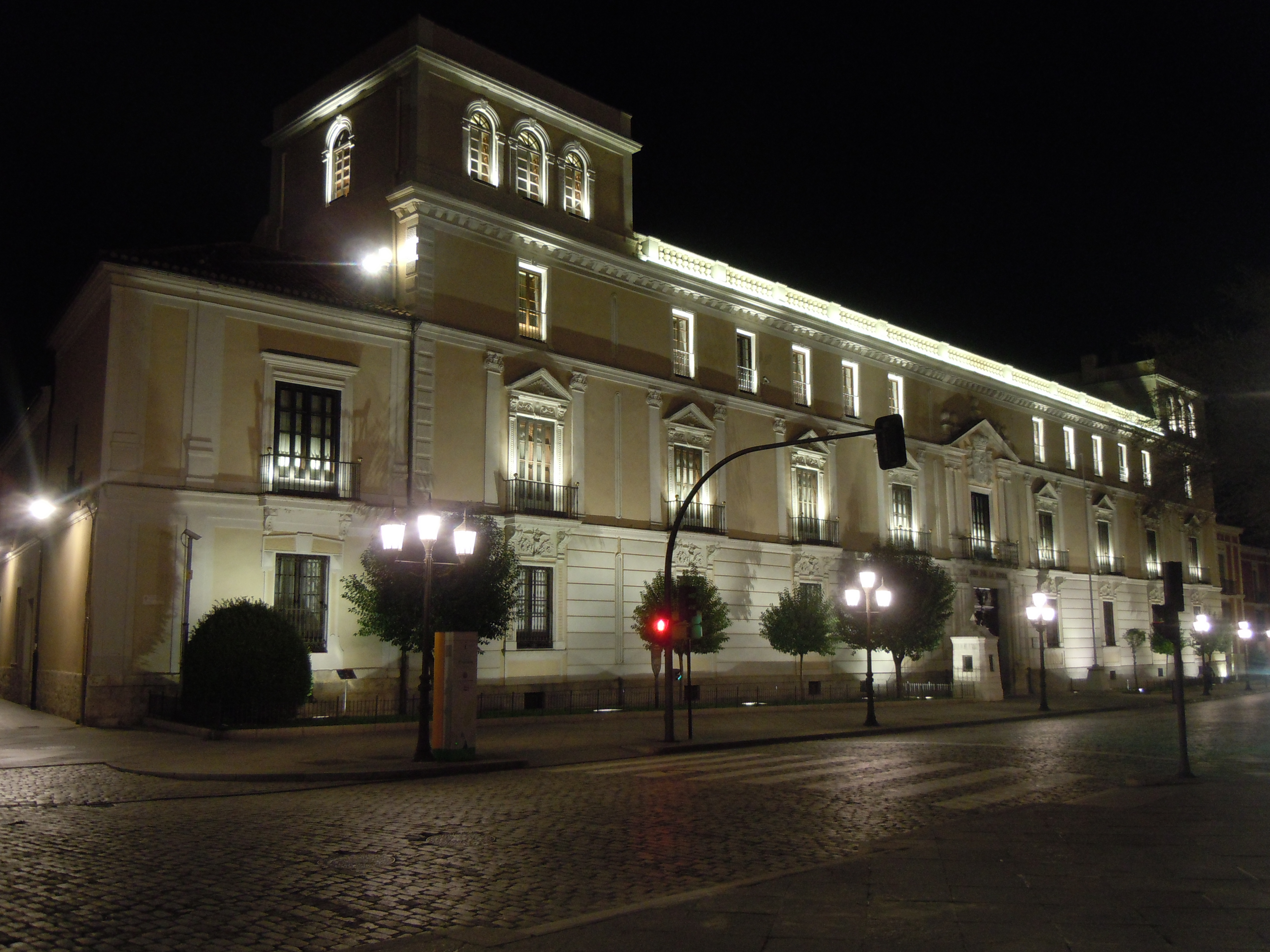
The Royal Palace at night

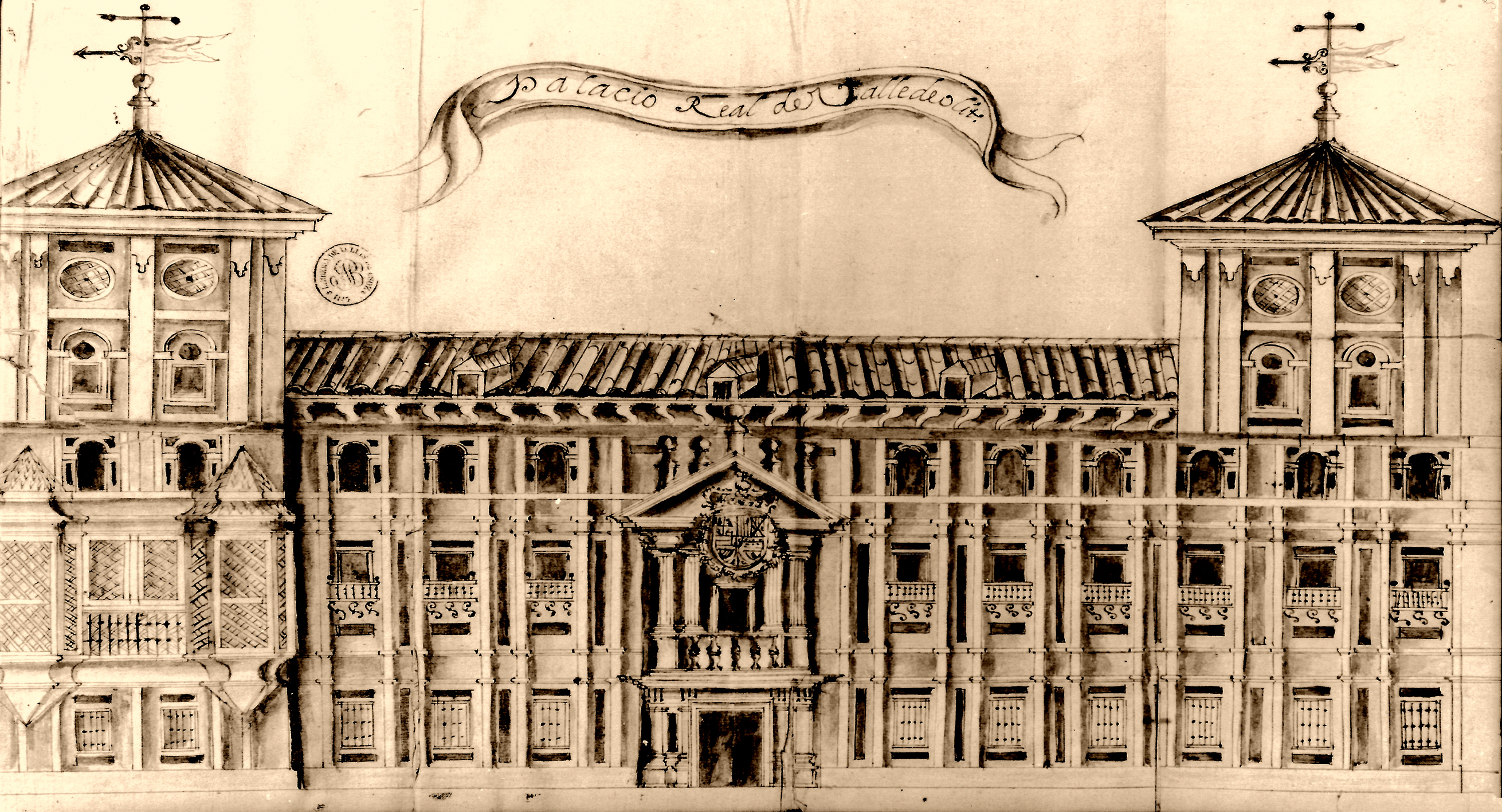
Drawing of the Royal Palace of Valladolid circa 1780, by Diego Përez Martínez.

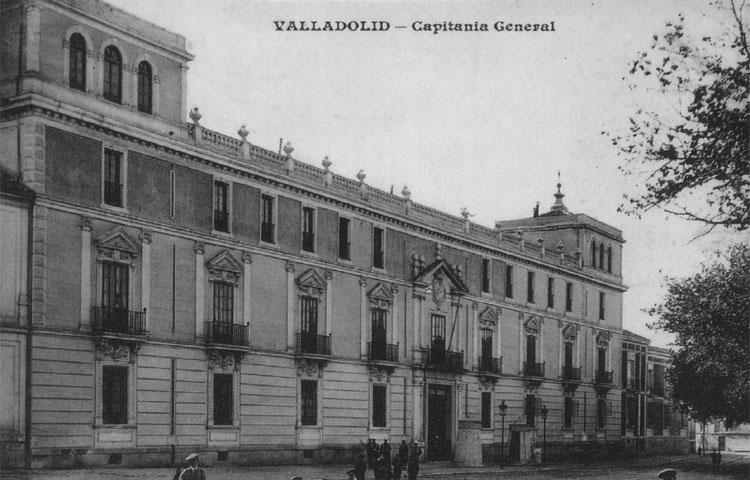
Photo of the Royal Palace in early-20th century

== History ==
Despite the fact that kings were present in Valladolid often, they lacked an official residence until the 17th century. When the Royal Court moved to the city, the palace of Francisco de los Cobos y Molina fulfilled that function. Francisco de los Cobos was a Secretary of State under Charles V, Holy Roman Emperor (King Charles I of Spain). Born in Úbeda, de los Cobos forged a spectacular political career. He married in 1522 María de Mendoza, daughter of the Count of Ribadavia, achieving thus the nobility rank that he lacked. De los Cobos built his palace nearby his in-laws (Palace of the Counts of Ribadavia) and next to St. Paul's Church, according to a 1524 project of royal architect Luis de Vega. The building was built around a magnificent, Renaissance-styled courtyard. Charles V later ordered its extension, resulting in a building of several courtyards, a chapel, and numerous state rooms.

== Use ==
In the 19th century the palace was transferred to the Spanish army and became the headquarters of the General Captaincy of the 7th Military Region (currently the 4th General Sub-inspection) of the Army. At the beginning of the 20th century significant renovations were made, with numerous structural changes being made to its original design.
