= José Luis Villacañas =

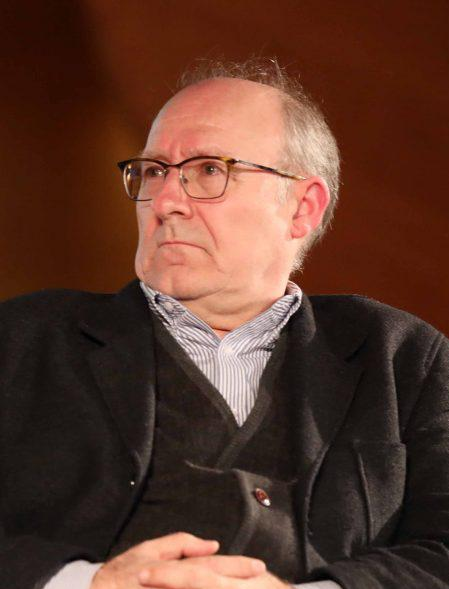
- Born: 10 June 1955; Úbeda
- Occupations: Political philosopher, philosophy historian, philosopher
- Employers: Complutense University of Madrid (2009–); Spanish National Research Council (1994–1997); University of Murcia (1986–1994); University of Murcia (2003–2009); University of Valencia (1977–1986)

José Luis Villacañas Berlanga (born in 1955) is a Spanish political philosopher and historian of political ideas.

== Biography ==
Born in Úbeda on 10 June 1955, he studied in the Colegio de la Sagrada Familia in his native town. He graduated in Philosophy in the University of Valencia in 1977; he later obtained his PhD in Philosophy with Realismo empírico e idealismo trascendental en la filosofía teórica de Kant. Los niveles de uso y de justificación in the same university. He has been full professor in the University of Murcia (UM) and, since 2009, in the Complutense University of Madrid (UCM).

== Works ==
- — (1999). La nación y la guerra. Confederación y Hegemonía como formas de concebir Europa. Murcia: Res Publica.
- — (2000). Ramiro de Maeztu y el ideal de la burguesía en España. Madrid: Espasa-Calpe.
- — (2001). La filosofía del idealismo alemán. Madrid: Síntesis.
- — (2004). Los latidos de la ciudad. Una introducción a la filosofía y al mundo actual. Barcelona: Ariel.
- — (2008). Poder y conflicto. Ensayos sobre Carl Schmitt. Madrid: Biblioteca Nueva.
- — (2014). Historia del poder político en España. Barcelona: RBA.
- — (2015). Populismo. Madrid: La Huerta Grande Editorial.
- — (2016). Teología política imperial y comunidad de salvación cristiana. Madrid: Editorial Trotta.
- — (2017). Freud lee el Quijote. Madrid: La Huerta Grande Editorial.
- — (2019). Imperiofilia y el populismo nacional-católico. Lengua de Trapo.
