= Arsenio Moreno =

Spanish writer, academic, and politician (1953–2021)

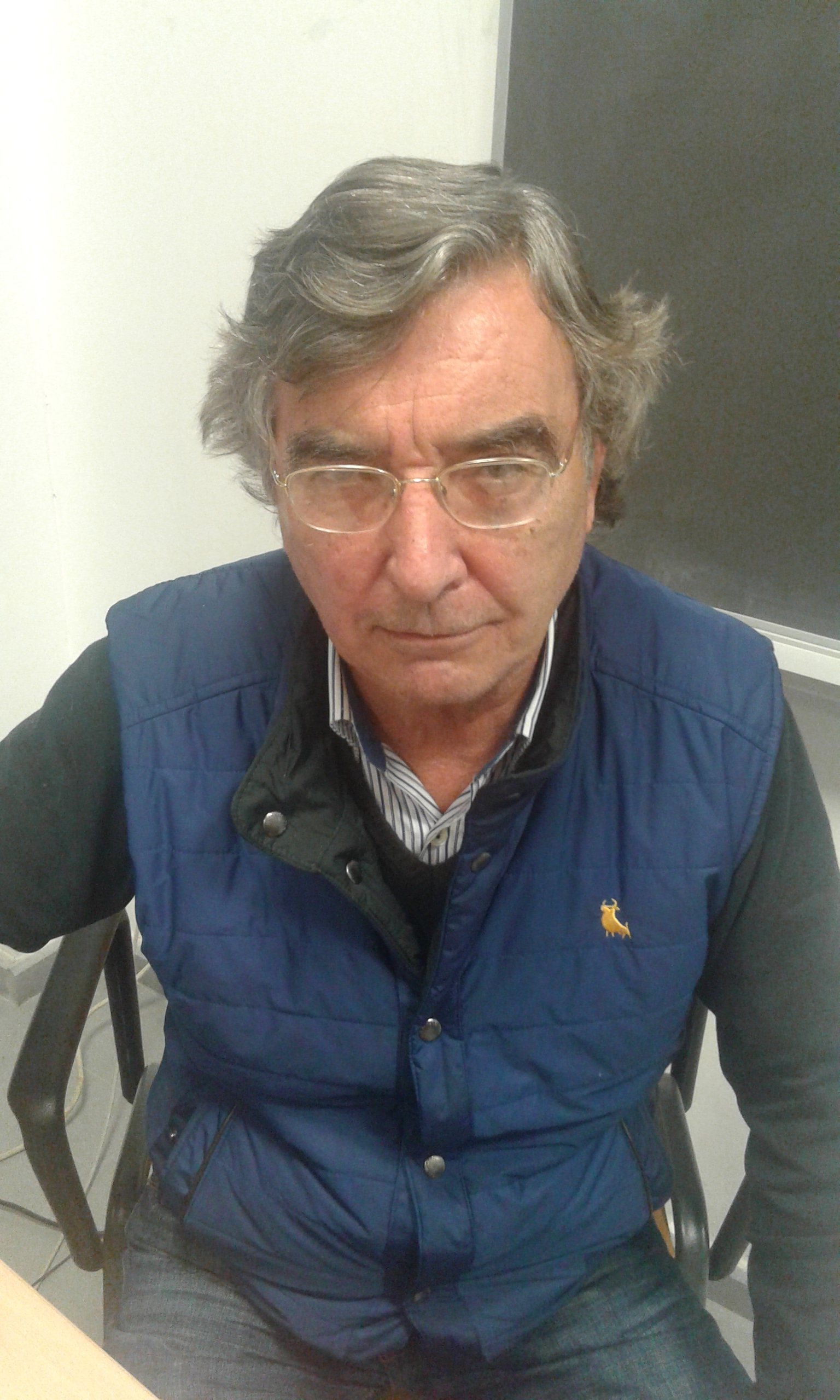

Mayor of Úbeda
- In office 23 May 1983 – 29 June 1989
- Preceded by: José Gámez Martínez
- Succeeded by: Juan José Pérez Padilla

Personal details
- Born: Arsenio Moreno Mendoza; 8 October 1953 Úbeda, Spain
- Died: 17 November 2021 (aged 68) Seville, Spain
- Party: PSOE–A
- Occupation: Writer; Academic

Arsenio Moreno Mendoza (8 October 1953 – 17 November 2021) was a Spanish writer, academic, and politician. He taught modern and contemporary history at Pablo de Olavide University and wrote numerous historical novels. A member of the Spanish Socialist Workers' Party of Andalusia, he served as mayor of Úbeda from 1983 to 1989.
