= Canena =

Canena, Spain
- city
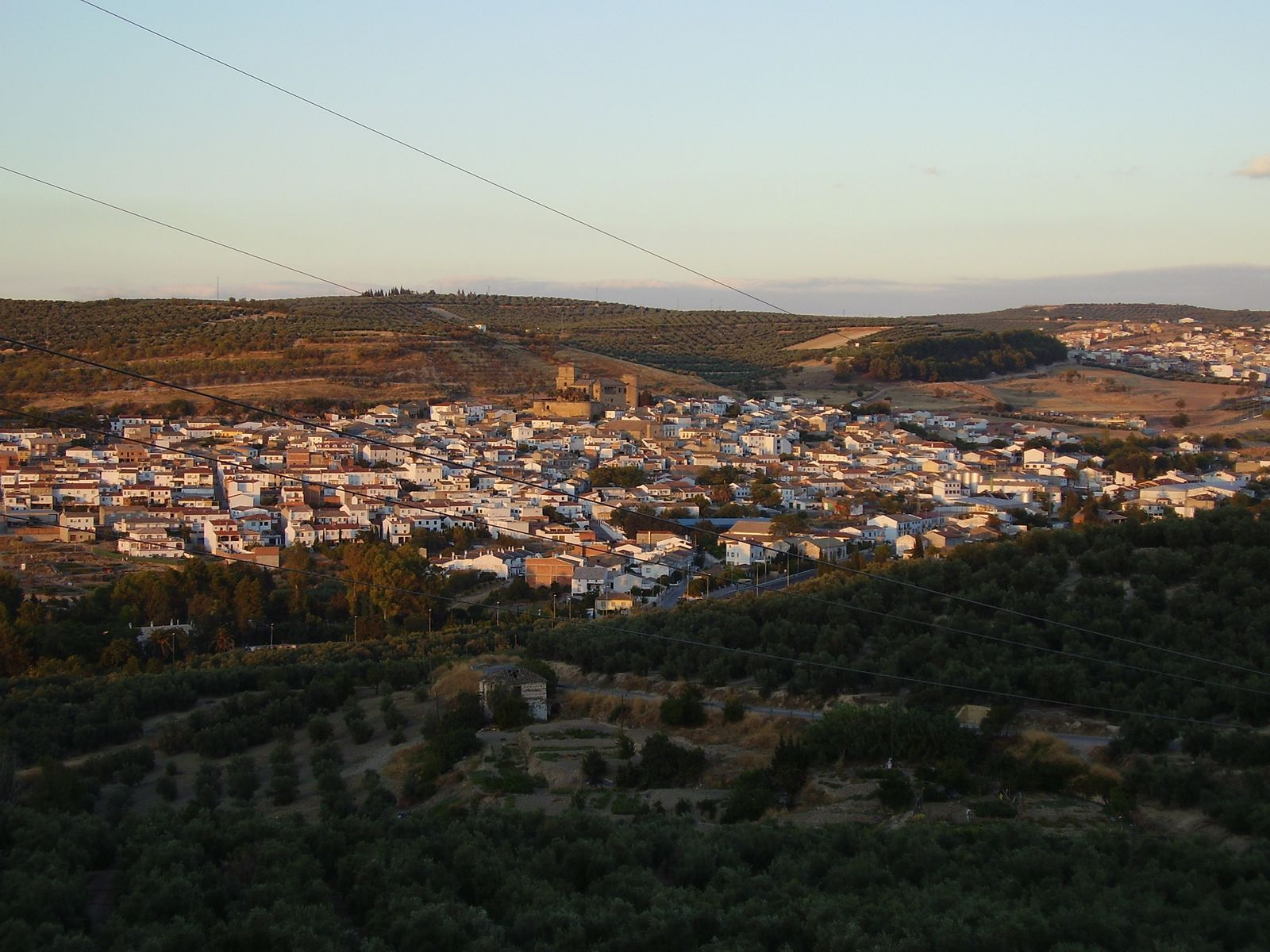
- Panoramic view of Canena

- Coat of arms

- Location in the Province of Jaén Canena (Andalusia) Canena (Spain)
- Coordinates: 38°03′N 3°28′W
- Country: Spain
- Autonomous community: Andalusia
- Province: Jaén
- Municipality: Canena

Area
  - Total: 14 km^{2} (5.4 sq mi)
- Elevation: 525 m (1,722 ft)

Population (2025-01-01)
  - Total: 1,717
  - Density: 120/km^{2} (320/sq mi)
- Time zone: UTC+1 (CET)
  - Summer (DST): UTC+2 (CEST)
- Website: dipujaen.com
- See also, Castilla de Canena

Canena is a city located in the province of Jaén, Spain. According to the 2014 estimate (INE), the city has a population of 1,981 inhabitants.

== Notable surroundings ==
Canena is located in the southern portion of Spain, in Jaén Province. Surrounding it, are several national parks, and mountains, as well as the city of Jaén. To the east is the Sierras de Cazorla Natural Park, to the south is the city of Jaén and the Sierra Mágina, and to the north and west is the Sierra de Andújar Natural Park as well as the Sierra Morena.

== See also ==
- List of municipalities in Jaén
