= Berruguete =

Berruguete is a surname. Notable people with the surname include:

- Alonso Berruguete (c. 1488–1561), Spanish painter
- Pedro Berruguete (c. 1450–1504), Spanish painter, father of Alonso
