= Francisco de los Cobos =

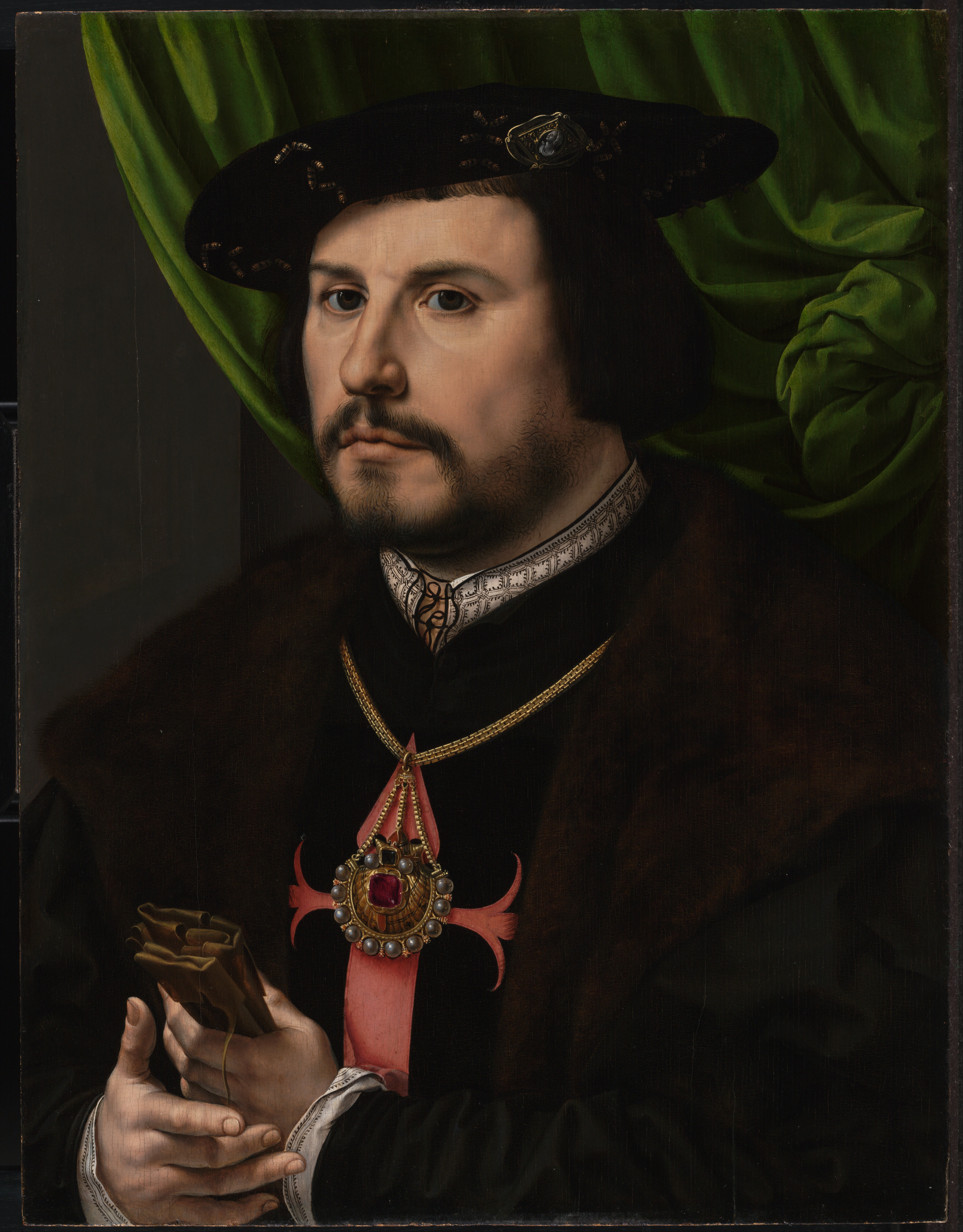
Portrait of Francisco de los Cobos by Jan Gossaert, ca. 1530

Francisco de los Cobos y Molina (c. 1477 – 10 May 1547) was the secretary of State and Comendador for the kingdom of Castile under the rule of the King Charles I of Spain, who was elected as Holy Roman Emperor in and reigned as Charles V from 1519.

== Biographical data ==
He was born in Úbeda ca. 1477 and died on 10 May 1547 in the same city. He was born to the aristocratic, though economically disadvantaged family of Don Pedro Rodríguez de los Cobos, he was the son of don Diego de los Cobos, regent of Ubeda, and Catalina de Molina. In 1522, he married the fourteen-year-old María de Mendoza y Sarmiento, daughter of Juan Hurtado de Mendoza and María de Sarmiento, 6th Countess of Ribadavia. His titles would be inherited by his only son Diego de los Cobos y Hurtado de Mendoza, (circa 1523 – 1575), who was subsequently awarded the title of 1st Marquis of Camarasa, together with his wife, by King Charles I, on 18 February 1543.

He was buried in the Sacra Capilla del Salvador in Úbeda in the Province of Jaén.

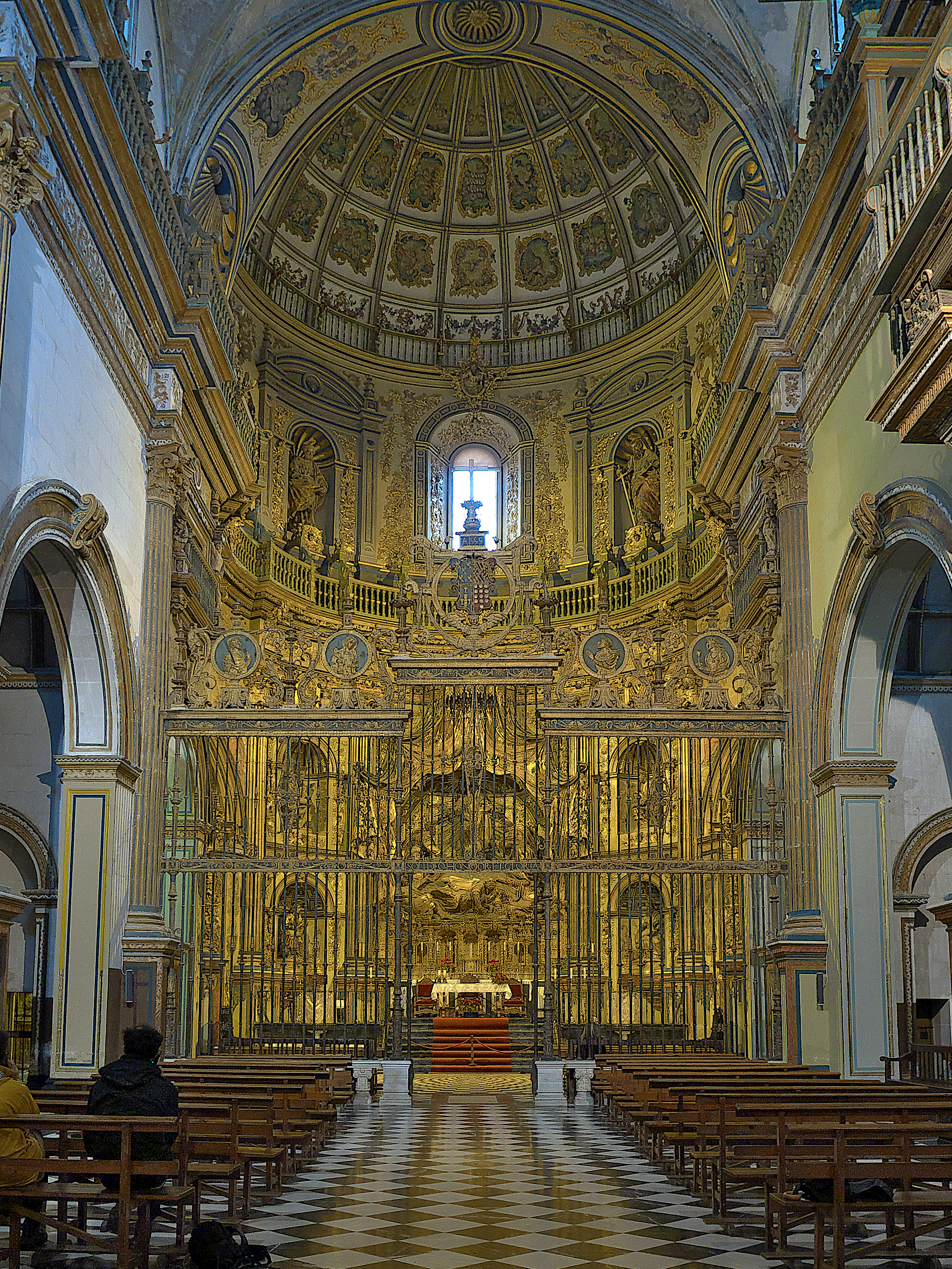
Sacra Capilla del Salvador, Úbeda

His daughter, Maria Sarmiento de Mendoza, married at Valladolid on 30 November 1538, Gonzalo II Fernández de Córdoba, Governor of the Duchy of Milan, 1558–1560 and 1563–1564, a Knight of the Order of the Golden Fleece since 1555. They had no children.

In 2008, this title was held by the duke of Segorbe, Ignacio Medina Fernández de Córdoba y Fernández de Henestrosa.

== Career in government ==
His career benefited from the help afforded by his uncle, Diego Vela Allide, treasurer and secretary of queen Isabella I of Castile. Later, by 1503, he worked as a scribe under the dean of the Queen's secretaries, Hernando de Zafra. In 1507, upon Zafra's death, he became first Treasurer of Granada, and then Regent for Úbeda the next year. These positions were entitled to collect tribute and payments to the crown.

After the death of king Ferdinand of Aragon in 1516, Cobos was charged by Cardinal Cisneros with traveling to Habsburg-ruled Flanders to become a counselor for the young new monarch, Charles I of Spain. This proved to be the crucial decision of his career, as through the favor of William II de Croÿ, Lord of Chièvres, he became secretary to the king. He advised Charles on matters that dealt with the Spanish portion of his domains, and emerged as a rival to Grand Chancellor Mercurino Gattinara. Gattinara's fall in 1528 confirmed Cobos's victory, and led to his assumption of the leadership of the council of State.

After traveling with Charles from 1529 until 1533, Cobos's expertise in financial matters kept him in Spain, where he served as the effective head of government until his death. He was succeeded by his main assistant and nephew Juan Vázquez de Molina.

== Patronage of the arts ==
Cobos was able to amass vast riches in his work with the state. He was able to use some of his riches in fostering patronage and acquiring art. He met Titian and arranged for Emperor Charles V's portrait by the famed Venetian artist. One sad note was the loss during a shipwreck of a large assembly of Italian works, including a Pietá by Sebastiano del Piombo and a series of paintings from the City council of Lucca. Additionally, he was able to collect portraits of royalty and nobility, as well as exotic gifts brought to Spain after the conquest of the Aztecs and Incas. He is known to have given a now lost Aztec manuscript bound in jaguar skin to the historian Paolo Giovio in Naples. His patronage also led to the Italianate Renaissance architecture found in the town center of Úbeda. The Royal Palace of Valladolid was built by Cobos, who built it around a magnificent renaissance-styled courtyard nearby the residence of his in-laws (Palace of the Counts of Ribadavia). The palace later became the temporary residence of the Spanish Monarch from King Charles I of Spain to Queen Isabella II of Spain.

== See also ==
- Secretary of State (Ancient Regime in Spain)
