= List of Intangible Cultural Heritage elements in Spain =

The United Nations Educational, Scientific and Cultural Organisation (UNESCO) intangible cultural heritage elements are the non-physical traditions and practices performed by a people. As part of a country's cultural heritage, they include celebrations, festivals, performances, oral traditions, music, and the making of handicrafts. The "intangible cultural heritage" is defined by the Convention for the Safeguarding of Intangible Cultural Heritage, drafted in 2003 and took effect in 2006. Inscription of new heritage elements on the UNESCO Intangible Cultural Heritage Lists for their protection and safeguard is determined by the Intergovernmental Committee for the Safeguarding of Intangible Cultural Heritage, an organisation established by the convention.

Spain signed the convention on 3 November 2003, ratified it on 6 October 2006, and it came into force in the country on 25 January 2007. Spain registered its first two elements on the Representative List of the Intangible Cultural Heritage of Humanity in 2008. As of 2024, it had registered twenty-two elements in the Representative List –of which eight are shared with other countries–, and four in the Register of Good Safeguarding Practices –of which one is shared with another country–.

On 28 May 2015, the national law for the safeguarding of Intangible Cultural Heritage came into force in Spain, in which the Spanish government can declare an element "Representative Manifestation of Intangible Cultural Heritage" (MRPCI) for its protection and safeguard at the national level, which makes it enter in the "General Inventory of Intangible Cultural Heritage" managed by the Ministry of Culture. It is the responsibility of the General State Administration, in collaboration with all other public administrations, to guarantee the conservation of the Spanish intangible heritage, as well as to promote its enrichment and to encourage and protect the access of all citizens to its different manifestations. As of 2023, three elements inscribed in the National General Inventory have subsequently been submitted to UNESCO, which inscribed them in its list for their protection and safeguard at the international level.

== Intangible Cultural Heritage of Humanity ==
+ Transnational element

=== Representative List ===
Name	Image	Year	No.	Description (Note: The description for each element is quoted (not in full) from the criteria of inscription in the UNESCO official website.)
Mystery Play of Elche		2008	00018	"The Mystery Play of Elche is a sacred musical drama of the death, the passage into heaven (known as the Assumption) and the crowning of the Virgin Mary. Since the mid-fifteenth century it has been performed in the Basilica of Santa María and in the streets of the old city of Elche (Alicante). It is a living testimony of European religious theatre of the Middle Ages and of the cult of the Virgin."
Patum of Berga		2008	00156	"The Patum of Berga is a popular festival whose origin can be traced to medieval festivities and parades accompanying the celebration of Corpus Christi. Theatrical performances and parades of a variety of effigies animate the streets of Berga (Barcelona). The celebration takes place every year during the week of Corpus Christi, between late May and late June."
Irrigators’ tribunals of the Spanish Mediterranean coast: the Council of Wise Men of the plain of Murcia and the Water Tribunal of the plain of Valencia		2009	00171	"The irrigators’ tribunals of the Spanish Mediterranean coast are traditional law courts for water management that date back to the Al-Andalus period (ninth to thirteenth centuries). The two main tribunals –the Council of Wise Men of the Plain of Murcia and the Water Tribunal of the Plain of Valencia– are recognized under Spanish law. Inspiring authority and respect, these two courts, whose members are elected democratically, settle disputes orally in a swift, transparent and impartial manner."
Whistled language of the island of La Gomera (Canary Islands), the Silbo Gomero		2009	00172	"The whistled language of La Gomera Island in the Canaries, the Silbo Gomero, replicates the islanders’ habitual language (Castilian Spanish) with whistling. Handed down over centuries from master to pupil, it is the only whistled language in the world that is fully developed and practised by a large community (more than 22,000 inhabitants)."
Chant of the Sybil on Majorca		2010	00360	"The chant of the Sybil is performed at matins on the night of 24 December in churches throughout Majorca. The chant marks the annual Christmas Vigil, and is sung by a boy or girl accompanied by two or more altar boys or girls. During the chant they walk through the church towards the chancel, the singer carrying a sword in his or her hands, held upright in front of the face, while the altar boys or girls carry candles."
Flamenco		2010	00363	"Flamenco is an artistic expression fusing song (cante), dance (baile), and musicianship (toque). Andalusia in southern Spain is the heartland of Flamenco, although it also has roots in regions such as Murcia and Extremadura. Cante is the vocal expression of flamenco, sung by men and women, preferably seated, with no backing singers. Baile is a dance of passion, courtship, expressing a wide range of situations ranging from sadness to joy. Toque or the art of guitar playing has long surpassed its original role as accompaniment."
Human towers		2010	00364	"Castells are human towers built by members of amateur groups, usually as part of annual festivities in Catalonian towns and cities. The traditional setting is the square in front of the town hall balcony. The human towers are formed by castellers standing on the shoulders of one another in a succession of stages (between six and ten)."
Festivity of 'la Mare de Déu de la Salut' of Algemesí		2011	00576	"The Festivity of ‘la Mare de Déu de la Salut’ is celebrated in Algemesí (Valencia). Every 7 and 8 September almost 1,400 people participate in theatre, music, dance and performances organized in the historical areas of the city. Processions run from the Basílica Menor de San Jaime to the Capella de la Troballa."
Fiesta of the patios in Cordova		2012	00846	"For twelve days at the beginning of May, the city of Cordova celebrates the Fiesta of the Patios. The patio houses are communal, family or multi-family dwellings or sets of individual houses with a shared patio, located in the city's historical quarter. This characteristic cultural space boasts an abundant array of plants, and during the fiesta inhabitants freely welcome all visitors to admire their beauty and the skill involved in their creation."
Mediterranean diet + (Note: Shared with Croatia, Cyprus, Greece, Italy, Morocco, and Portugal.)		2013	00884	"The Mediterranean diet involves a set of skills, knowledge, rituals, symbols and traditions concerning crops, harvesting, fishing, animal husbandry, conservation, processing, cooking, and particularly the sharing and consumption of food. Eating together is the foundation of the cultural identity and continuity of communities throughout the Mediterranean basin."
Summer solstice fire festivals in the Pyrenees + (Note: Shared with Andorra and France.)		2015	01073	"The summer solstice fire festivals take place in the Pyrenees each year on the same night when the sun is at its zenith. Once night falls, people from different towns and villages carry flaming torches down the mountains to light a variety of traditionally constructed beacons. The descent is a special moment for young people, signifying the transition from adolescence to adulthood."
Valencia Fallas festivity		2016	00859	"The main feature of the Fallas Festivity, a tradition of communities in Valencia and its diaspora celebrating the coming of spring, is the giant falla. The falla is a monument made up of ninots (caricature pieces) created by local artists and craftspeople that provides a commentary on current social issues. The falla is set alight at the end of the festivity, which runs from March 14 to 19, to symbolize the coming of spring, purification and a rejuvenation of community social activity."
Tamboradas drum-playing rituals		2018	01208	"Tamboradas drum-playing rituals are loud, group rituals based on the simultaneous, intense beating of thousands of drums, played uninterruptedly for days and nights in public spaces in towns and villages. Each year, this creates a captivating landscape of sound and identity in an atmosphere charged with emotion and an intense feeling of collective communion. The tamboradas are part of the Catholic Holy Week celebrations, and have special significance according to different places, days and times."
Art of dry stone construction, knowledge and techniques + (Note: Shared with Croatia, Cyprus, France, Greece, Italy, Slovenia, Switzerland, Andorra, Austria, Belgium, Ireland, and Luxembourg.)		2018	02106	"The art of dry stone walling concerns the knowhow related to making stone constructions by stacking stones upon each other, without using any other materials except sometimes dry soil. Dry stone structures are spread across most rural areas –mainly in steep terrains– both inside and outside inhabited spaces, though they are not unknown in urban areas."
Artisanal talavera of Puebla and Tlaxcala (Mexico) and ceramics of Talavera de la Reina and El Puente del Arzobispo (Spain) making process + (Note: Shared with Mexico.)		2019	01462	"The processes of making the artisanal talavera of Puebla and Tlaxcala (Mexico) and ceramics of Talavera de la Reina and El Puente del Arzobispo (Toledo, Spain) are identified with two communities in both Mexico and Spain. The ceramics have domestic, decorative and architectural uses. Despite changes over time and the developments ceramics have undergone in both countries the artisanal making processes, including making techniques, enameling and decoration, retain the same pattern as in the sixteenth century."
Wine Horses		2020	00860	"Los Caballos del Vino (Wine Horses) takes place each year from 1–3 May in Caravaca de la Cruz (Murcia) and forms part of the fiestas held in honour of the Santísima y Vera Cruz in Caravaca. The equestrian ritual consists of a series of events in which the horse is the protagonist. The process of enjaezamiento involves dressing the horses in beautiful cloaks richly embroidered in silk and gold thread."
Falconry, a living human heritage + (Note: Shared with Austria, Belgium, Croatia, Czechia, France, Germany, Hungary, Ireland, Italy, Kazakhstan, Kyrgyzstan, Mongolia, Morocco, Netherlands, Pakistan, Poland, Portugal, Qatar, Saudi Arabia, Slovakia, South Korea, Syria, and the United Arab Emirates.)		2021	01708	"Falconry is the traditional art and practice of training and flying falcons –and sometimes eagles, hawks, buzzards and other birds of prey–. It has been practised for over 4,000 years. The practice of falconry in early and medieval periods of history is documented in many parts of the world."
Timber rafting + (Note: Shared with Austria, Czechia, Germany, Latvia, and Poland.)		2022	01866	"Timber rafting originated in the Middle Ages, when rafts were used to transport wood, goods and people using natural water flows. In the past, rafters traveling to remote destinations spent weeks living and working together on their raft. As a result, a community sharing the knowledge, skills, techniques and values of making and navigating timber rafts emerged."
Manual bell ringing + (Note: Shared with Italy.)		2022	02100	"Over the centuries, bell ringing has served as a means of expression and communication in Spain, fulfilling a number of social functions, from information-sharing, to coordination, protection and cohesion. The coded messages conveyed through the ringing are recognized by the various communities and help to structure local life. There is a wide variety of sounds determined by the techniques (chiming, turning or half turning) combined with the skills of bell ringers and the physical characteristics and acoustical properties of the bells, towers and belfries."
Knowledge, craft and skills of handmade glass production + (Note: Shared with Czechia, Finland, France, Germany, and Hungary.)		2023	01961	"Traditional handmade glass production entails shaping and decorating hot and cold glass to produce hollow glass objects, flat glass and crown glass. It is characterised by the high degree of craftsmanship inherent to the work and by strong team values due to the need to respect the previous steps performed by other glassmakers."
Transhumance, the seasonal droving of livestock + (Note: Shared with Albania, Andorra, Austria, Croatia, France, Greece, Italy, Luxembourg, and Romania.)		2023	01964	"Transhumance refers to the seasonal movement of people with their livestock between geographical or climatic regions. Each year, in spring and autumn, men and women herders organise the movement of thousands of animals along traditional pastoral paths. They move on foot or horseback, leading with their dogs and sometimes accompanied by their families."
Asturian cider culture		2024	01959	"Asturian cider culture refers to the spaces and processes for producing, serving and enjoying natural cider in Asturias."

=== Good Safeguarding Practices ===
Name	Year	No.	Description
Centre for traditional culture – school museum of Pusol pedagogic project	2009	00306	"This innovative education project has two overall goals: to promote value-based education by integrating the local cultural and natural heritage within the curriculum, and to contribute to the preservation of Elche's heritage by means of education, training and direct actions."
Revitalization of the traditional craftsmanship of lime-making in Morón de la Frontera	2011	00511	"The traditional practice of lime-making was a source of employment for Morón de la Frontera (Seville) and a marker of its identity. When production was eclipsed by industrial lime, kilns fell into disuse and transmission of knowledge ceased. The project's primary goals are to raise awareness of the practice and importance of lime-making and to improve living conditions for craftspeople."
Methodology for inventorying intangible cultural heritage in biosphere reserves: the experience of Montseny	2013	00648	"Initiated by the UNESCO Centre in Catalonia, the project focuses on the identification of intangible cultural heritage in a biosphere reserve and the drawing up of inventories. The project was undertaken in an area covering the Montseny Biosphere Reserve and Natural Park (Barcelona), in cooperation with local stakeholders and institutions working in the fields of ethnology and traditional and popular Catalan culture."
Portuguese-Galician border ICH: a safeguarding model created by Ponte...nas ondas! + (Note: Shared with Portugal.)	2022	01848	"The Ponte...nas ondas! (PNO!) project aims to safeguard intangible cultural heritage on the Portuguese-Galician border by creating spaces in which the heritage can be practiced and transmitted to younger generations. Initially developed in schools of the municipalities of Salvaterra de Miño (Pontevedra, Spain) and Monção (Viana do Castelo, Portugal), the project later spread to many other schools and institutions."

== National General Inventory ==
Since 2015, the Ministry of Culture of Spain manages the "General Inventory of Intangible Cultural Heritage" that lists those elements designated "Representative Manifestation of Intangible Cultural Heritage" (MRPCI) for its protection and safeguarding at the national level.

↑ Element inscribed later in the UNESCO Representative List

Name	Date	No.	Description	Ref.
Carnival	8 April 2017	01	Carnival is a festive celebration in Spain documented since the Middle Ages and with a rich personality of its own since the Renaissance throughout the country.	
Holy Week	8 April 2017	02	Spain is known for its Holy Week traditions. The celebration of Holy Week, that have their origins in the Middle Ages, relies almost exclusively on the processions of the brotherhoods or fraternities.	
Transhumance ↑	8 April 2017	03		
Sexenni	5 April 2019	04	Sexenni is a festival that is celebrated every six years in Morella (Castellón) in honor of Our Lady of Vallivana	
Culture of esparto	22 April 2019	05	Esparto is a fiber produced from two species of perennial grasses used for crafts, such as cords, basketry, and espadrilles.	
Manual bell ringing ↑	22 April 2019	06		
Musical Societies of the Valencian Community	30 March 2021	07	At the time of its designation, there were a total of 550 federated Musical Societies in the Valencian Community, with more than 1,100 music bands, over 43,000 musicians and 600 educational centers with 60,000 students and over 5,000 teachers.	
Blown glass technique ↑	6 July 2021	08		
Nativity scenes	14 June 2022	09	Nativity scenes have been a tradition in Spain since the mid-18th century. The designation includes both the tradition and the art of handcrafting its figures, as well as the process and techniques used in assembling the scene.	
Spanish knot	8 November 2022	10	The simple knot, called "Spanish" because it was used almost exclusively in the old carpets made in the Iberian Peninsula, is tied around one single warp. Currently, only one craft production of the Spanish knot remains, that of the Royal Tapestry Factory.	
Jota as a traditional genre	4 July 2023	11	The jota is a genre of music and the associated dance known throughout Spain. It is danced and sung accompanied by castanets, and the interpreters tend to wear regional costumes.	
Zarzuela	30 January 2024	12	Zarzuela is a Spanish lyric-dramatic genre that alternates between spoken and sung scenes, the latter incorporating operatic and popular songs, as well as dance.	
Cultural expressions linked to deaf culture and the Spanish Sign Language	6 February 2024	13	The Spanish deaf community is recognized as a linguistic and cultural minority, with a specific identity, social and cultural features, and its own language.	
Traditional guitar playing in the framework of participatory festivals	2 April 2024	14	The use of the guitar as an essential element of some festivals has given rise to the creation of specific ways of playing, tuning, or naming that have been maintained to date thanks to oral transmission.	
Beekeeping in Spain	11 March 2025	15	The practice of beekeeping entails a series of identity and territorial management values linked through its development as an activity deeply connected to the territory throughout Spain.	
The hórreos of the north of the Iberian Peninsula	8 April 2026	16	Hórreos are traditional agricultural buildings found throughout the north of the Iberian Peninsula, designed to store and preserve food, especially grain, away from moisture and rodents, keeping it in optimal condition.	
The use of the braille reading and writing system of the Spanish languages	15 July 2026	17	The use of the Spanish/Galician, Basque, and Catalan Braille reading and writing systems goes beyond mere functionality, becoming a key element for the exercise of cultural rights and the consolidation of a vital intangible heritage, with essential values in the construction of the identity and collective memory of blind, deafblind, and severely visually impaired people.	

== See also ==
- List of World Heritage Sites in Spain
