= List of World Heritage Sites in Spain =

Location of World Heritage Sites within Spain (sites in the Canary Islands are shown in the inset). Green dots indicate the Ancient Beech Forest sites, orange dots are the sites of Mudéjar architecture of Aragon. The Works of Antoni Gaudí (seven buildings) are located in or near Barcelona, as are the Palau de la Música Catalana and Hospital de Sant Pau. Small blue dots indicate the Cave of Altamira and Paleolithic Cave Art of Northern Spain (18 sites). Purple dots are the Way of St James (20 sites). Rock art of the Iberian Mediterranean Basin includes over 750 sites that are not shown on the map.

The United Nations Educational, Scientific and Cultural Organization (UNESCO) World Heritage Sites are places of importance to cultural or natural heritage as described in the UNESCO World Heritage Convention, established in 1972. Cultural heritage consists of monuments (such as architectural works, monumental sculptures, or inscriptions), groups of buildings, and sites (including archaeological sites). Natural features (consisting of physical and biological formations), geological and physiographical formations (including habitats of threatened species of animals and plants), and natural sites which are important from the point of view of science, conservation or natural beauty, are defined as natural heritage. Spain ratified the convention on May 4, 1982, making its historical sites eligible for inclusion on the list.

Spain has 50 sites on the list, which is the fifth largest number of sites per country, behind Italy (62), China (61), France (56), and Germany (55). In addition, Spain has 35 sites on its tentative list. Sites in Spain were first inscribed on the list at the 8th Session of the World Heritage Committee, held in Buenos Aires, Argentina in 1984. At that session, five sites were added: the Cathedral of Our Lady of the Assumption, Córdoba; The Alhambra and the Generalife, Granada; Burgos Cathedral; Monastery and Site of the Escorial, Madrid; and Park Güell, Palau Güell and Casa Milà, in Barcelona. Five sites were added in 1985, and another four in 1986. Apart from 1984, 1985, and 1986 (Spain's first three years as a member), 2000 saw the most new sites inscribed, with five that year.

Of Spain's 50 sites, 44 are cultural, 4 are natural, and 2 are mixed (meeting both cultural and natural criteria). Three sites are located in the Balearic Islands and four are in the Canary Islands. Four sites are transnational. The Pirineos – Monte Perdido World Heritage Site is shared with France, the Prehistoric Rock-Art Sites in the Côa Valley and Siega Verde site is shared with Portugal, Almadén is listed alongside Idrija in Slovenia and the Ancient and Primeval Beech Forests of the Carpathians and Other Regions of Europe are shared with 17 other European countries.

== World Heritage Sites ==
UNESCO lists sites under ten criteria; each entry must meet at least one of the criteria. Criteria i through vi are cultural, and vii through x are natural.

* Transnational site

World Heritage Sites
Site	Image	Location (community)	Year listed	UNESCO data	Description
Historic Centre of Córdoba	A view of the Mosque-Cathedral over a river and a Roman bridge in front	Andalusia	1984	313bis; i, ii, iii, iv (cultural)	In the 8th century, Cordoba became the capital of the emirate and in 929 the capital of the Caliphate of Córdoba. Its architecture with numerous mosques and palaces rivaled that of Constantinople, Damascus, and Baghdad. Initially, the Mosque–Cathedral of Córdoba was independently listed as a World Heritage Site. The 8th century Great Mosque, turned into a cathedral in the 13th century, had a great influence on the Moorish architecture and later on the Moorish Revival architecture of the 19th century. In 1994, the site was expanded to cover the historic centre of the city.
Alhambra, Generalife and Albayzín	A fountain with lion statues in the middle of an Islamic palace courtyard	Andalusia	1984	314bis; i, iii, iv (cultural)	The three sites illustrate the Moorish influence in southern Spain. The fortress Alhambra and the palace Generalife were built by the rulers of the Emirate of Granada between the 13th and 15th centuries. They represent the aesthetic approaches of the Nasrid Dynasty with the use of plaster, wood, and ceramics as decorative elements, as well as the use of vegetation and water (the Court of the Lions pictured). The Albayzín district, added to the site in 1994, contains examples of the Moorish vernacular architecture, with later Spanish additions in Renaissance and Baroque styles.
Burgos Cathedral	A Gothic cathedral with two spires	Castile and León	1984	316bis; ii, iv, vi (cultural)	Construction of the Gothic cathedral commenced in 1221 and was finished over 300 years later. It was influential in the diffusion of French Gothic architecture in Spain. It hosted one of the most important Medieval workshops, with Spanish and international artists creating numerous masterpieces, including the tombs, altars, and a monumental staircase. The cathedral is also the burial place of Spanish national hero, El Cid. A minor boundary modification of the site took place in 2014.
Monastery and Site of the Escorial	A look at a large monastery and palace complex from above	Madrid	1984	318; i, ii, vi (cultural)	The site of El Escorial was founded in 1563 on the orders of King Philip II and was designed by the architect Juan Bautista de Toledo. The complex comprises a monastery, a royal palace, a school, a seminary, and a royal library. There are also two country villas. The style of the complex is austere and sparsely ornate, representing a break from the styles from the previous periods. The complex symbolized the Spanish Catholic Monarchy during the Spanish Golden Age of the 16th and 17th centuries under the Habsburg monarchs.
Works of Antoni Gaudí	Casa Milà, a modernist multi-storey building with a wavy facade and ornamentation	Catalonia	1984	320bis; i, ii, iv (cultural)	This site comprises seven works of the Catalan architect Antoni Gaudí (1852–1926) in Barcelona and its surroundings. Gaudí was the most prominent member of the Modernisme art movement and developed a very personal style. Park Güell, Palau Güell, and Casa Milà (pictured) were originally listed in 1984, the 2005 extension added Casa Vicens, the crypt and nativity façade of Sagrada Família, Casa Batlló, and the crypt at Colònia Güell.
Cave of Altamira and Paleolithic Cave Art of Northern Spain	Cave painting of a bison	Cantabria, Asturias, Basque Country	1985	310bis; i, iii (cultural)	The Cave of Altamira, discovered in 1879, contains examples of cave painting from the Upper Paleolithic period, ranging from 35,000 to 11,000 BC, especially from the Magdalenian culture. In 2008, the site was expanded to include a further 17 decorated caves in northern Spain. The caves are well-preserved because of their deep isolation from the external climate and provide an insight into the lives and symbolic beliefs of hunter-gatherer societies.
Old Town of Segovia and its Aqueduct	View of Segovia with the Alcázar in front and the cathedral in the background	Castile and León	1985	311bis; i, iii, iv (cultural)	The history of Segovia was shaped by different communities that inhabited it at different times, first the Romans and then the Moors, Jews, and Christians. The Roman aqueduct was constructed in the 1st century, the medieval Alcázar palace in the 11th century, and the Gothic cathedral in the 16th. A minor boundary modification of the site took place in 2015.
Monuments of Oviedo and the Kingdom of the Asturias	A pre-Romanesque church building with round arches	Asturias	1985	312bis; i, ii, iv (cultural)	The Kingdom of Asturias, with the capital in Oviedo, remained the only Christian region of Spain in the 9th century. It developed its own style of Pre-Romanesque art and architecture, the Asturian architecture, that is displayed in various churches and other monuments. Initially listing three churches as the "Churches of the Kingdom of the Asturias", the site was expanded in 1998 to include two further churches and the medieval hydraulic system called La Foncalada. The Santa María del Naranco church is pictured.
Santiago de Compostela (Old Town)	Cathedral of Santiago de Compostela, a large church with a decorated facade and two spires	Galicia	1985	347; i, ii, vi (cultural)	The Cathedral of Santiago de Compostela (pictured), the reputed burial-place of the apostle James, is the terminus of the Way of St. James, one of the most important pilgrimage routes. The town was destroyed by the Moors in the 10th century and rebuilt during the following century. The cathedral is a masterpiece of Romanesque architecture and there are also numerous monuments from later periods in the Old Town.
Old Town of Ávila with its Extra-Muros Churches	City wall of Ávila with stone bastions	Castile and León	1985	348bis; iii, iv (cultural)	Ávila was founded in the 11th century to protect the lands from the Moors. It is a prominent example of a fortified medieval city, with its city walls (pictured) still fully intact. The World Heritage Site comprises the old walled town and ten churches and monasteries, including the Basilica of San Vicente and Convento de San José, located outside the city walls. A minor boundary modification of the site took place in 2007.
Mudéjar Architecture of Aragon	A church with a bell tower in Mudéjar style	Aragon	1986	378ter; iv (cultural)	Mudéjar art developed after the Reconquista and reflects the meeting between the Islamic and European styles, especially the Gothic, and was prominent between the 12th and 17th centuries. In Aragon, the monuments in this style feature decorative elements of the numerous societies that historically inhabited the area. They demonstrate a peaceful coexistence of different cultures. The site comprises ten most representative monuments, mainly churches and towers. Four churches in Teruel were originally listed as Mudejar Architecture of Teruel, further sites were included in 2001, and a minor boundary modification took place in 2016. The Teruel Cathedral is pictured.
Historic City of Toledo	View of Toledo across the Tagus river	Castile-La Mancha	1986	379; i, ii, iii, iv (cultural)	Toledo was founded by the Romans, served as the capital of the Visigothic Kingdom, was important in Muslim Spain and during the Reconquista, and briefly served as the capital of Spain in the mid-16th century. The city combines Christian, Muslim, and Jewish influences. During the Renaissance, it was one of the most important artistic centres of the country. There are numerous monuments in different style, with the Mudéjar architecture featuring prominently.
Garajonay National Park	Hills covered by lush vegetation	Canary Islands	1986	380; vii, ix (natural)	The park, located in the island of La Gomera, is covered by laurisilva (laurel forest), a relict type of vegetation from the Paleogene period that was once common in Southern Europe and North Africa but has since disappeared from the continent and can now only be found in the islands of Macaronesia. It is characterized by lush evergreen vegetation, often surrounded by a sea of fog that provides moisture in otherwise arid islands. There are numerous endemic plant and animal species, including two bird species, Bolle's pigeon and laurel pigeon.
Old Town of Cáceres	View at a stone tower, a staircase, and a loggia from a town square	Extremadura	1986	384bis; iii, iv (cultural)	During the Reconquista, Cáceres was a frequent battle arena between the Christians and the Moors, which resulted in an extensive defensive system build by the Almohads. The ensemble of the city walls with around 30 towers (Bujaco tower, the best known, pictured) have been largely preserved. The old town combines Roman, Islamic, Northern Gothic, and Italian Renaissance architectural influences. Monuments include churches, convents, and palaces. A minor boundary modification took place in 2016.
Cathedral, Alcázar and Archivo de Indias in Seville	View from the centre of Seville, showing a large Gothic Cathedral in the centre, the Archives building on the left and the Alcazar walls on the right	Andalusia	1987	383bis; i, ii, iii, iv (cultural)	The three monuments in Seville are directly associated with the Spanish colonization of the Americas during the Spanish Golden Age. The Cathedral (pictured in the centre) is the largest Gothic cathedral in Europe and is the resting place of Christopher Columbus. Both its bell tower, the Giralda, and the Alcázar are prominent examples of the Almohad architecture, with later additions in the Mudéjar style. The Renaissance Archivo de Indias hosted documents related to the discovery and relations with the New World.
Old City of Salamanca	Cathedral of Salamanca, a Gothic building viewed across a river	Castile and León	1988	381rev; i, ii, iv (cultural)	Salamanca is an important university city, with the University of Salamanca, founded in 1218, being the oldest in Spain and among the oldest in Europe. The city was first conquered by the Carthaginians in the 3rd century, and later ruled by the Romans and Moors. The city centre had numerous monuments in Romanesque, Gothic, Moorish, Renaissance, and Baroque styles, including the Old and New Cathedral (pictured), Plaza Mayor, and Convento de San Esteban. Salamanca was a centre of the Churrigueresque Baroque style that was popular in the 18th century and also influential in Latin America.
Poblet Monastery	Poblet Monastery front view with a decorated entrance and several towers in the background	Catalonia	1991	518rev; i, iv (cultural)	The monastery was founded by the Cistercians in 1151 and is one of the largest in Spain. It is a burial site associated with the Crown of Aragon. It played an important role in the life of the region. There are numerous monuments and artworks from different historical periods. The confiscation of ecclesiastical property in 1835 resulted in the abandonment of the monastery and subsequent deterioration. In the 1930s, a restoration project begun and the monks returned in 1940.
Archaeological Ensemble of Mérida	Roman Theatre of Mérida	Extremadura	1993	664; iii, iv (cultural)	Mérida was founded in 25 BC by the Romans as Emerita Augusta and was the capital of the Lusitania province. Remains from the Roman era include a bridge, aqueduct, amphitheatre, theatre (pictured), circus, and forum. There are also remains of a water-management system, including dams and aqueducts.
Royal Monastery of Santa María de Guadalupe	A view at the tower and church from the cloistre, a mix of Gothic and Mudéjar architecture	Extremadura	1993	665; iv, vi (cultural)	The monastery was founded in 1337. It is an ensemble of different architectural styles, including Mudéjar, Gothic, and Baroque, and is home to an important collection of paintings by Zurbarán and Luca Giordano. The monastery, which houses the famous statue of Our Lady of Guadalupe, also symbolizes two events that took place in 1492, the fall of Granada, representing the end of Reconquista, and the discovery of the Americas by Christopher Columbus. The Statue of Our Lady became a powerful symbol of the Christianisation of the New World.
Routes of Santiago de Compostela: Camino Francés and Routes of Northern Spain	Gothic cathedral with one bell tower	several sites	1993	669bis; ii, iv, vi (cultural)	The Route, or the Way of St. James, commonly known as Camino de Santiago, is a network of pilgrimage routes starting in various parts of Europe and reaching the Cathedral of Santiago de Compostela, where the apostle James is believed to be buried. Pilgrims started visiting the site in the 9th century and since then, the routes have become an ensemble of shrines, churches, hospitals, hostels, monasteries, calvaries, bridges, and other structures. They reflect the evolution of the architectural styles, including Romanesque, Gothic, Renaissance, and Baroque. The influx of pilgrims also resulted in the growth of the cities along the routes. Originally listed as Route of Santiago de Compostela and covering the sites along the French Way, the site was expanded in 2015 to include in total five traditional routes. The Oviedo Cathedral is pictured.
Doñana National Park	Marshes in the Doñana National Park	Andalusia	1994	685bis; vii, ix, x (natural)	The park consists of the delta region where the Guadalquivir River reaches the Atlantic Ocean. It is an important wetland and home to a diverse variety of biotopes, such as lagoons, marshlands, dunes, and maquis. The park is one of the largest heronries in the Mediterranean region and holds more than 500,000 water fowl during the winter period. It is also home to the threatened Iberian lynx. The site was expanded in 2005.
Historic Walled Town of Cuenca	A town located on a rocky hill	Castile-La Mancha	1996	781; ii, v (cultural)	Cuenca is a prominent example of a medieval fortress-town. It was build by the Moors and captured by the Christians in the 12th century. The cathedral is the first Gothic cathedral in Spain. The town is also known for its casas colgadas, houses that hang over the edge of a cliff. It has remained largely preserved partly owing to a long period of economic stagnation.
La Lonja de la Seda de Valencia	A large Gothic building with a flag on the tower	Valencian Community	1996	782; i, iv (cultural)	The Silk Exchange in Valencia is a complex of Valencian Gothic buildings that was constructed between 1482 and 1533. It is a prominent example of secular buildings that demonstrates the power of Mediterranean mercantile city-states in the 15th and 16th centuries.
Pyrénées - Mont Perdu*	High mountains above the tree line and a glacial valley	Aragon	1997	773bis; iii, iv, v, vii, viii (mixed)	The mountain landscape around Mont Perdu (Monte Perdido, pictured) is home to communities who have been practicing transhumance through centuries, with Spanish farmers also graze their herds on the French side. This type of life was once widespread in mountainous parts of Europe but is rare today. From the natural point of view, there are numerous geological landforms, such as deep canyons and cirques. There are meadows, forests, caves, and lakes that provide home to different assemblies of mountain flora and fauna. The site was initially listed in Spain, the French part around Gèdre was added in 1999.
Las Médulas	Landscape with isolated peaks bearing signs of ancient mining operations	Castile and León	1997	803; i, ii, iii, iv (cultural)	The Romans established a gold mine in the 1st century CE and worked the site for two centuries. They used an early form of hydraulic mining, called Ruina montium, and cut aqueducts in the rock cliffs to provide water for the operations. The Romans left in the early 3rd century, leaving sheer cliff faces and mining infrastructure that is intact today - as no subsequent industrial activity followed.
Palau de la Música Catalana and Hospital de Sant Pau, Barcelona	Interior of a concert hall with rich decoration	Catalonia	1997	804bis; i, ii, iv (cultural)	The two early 20th century buildings were designed by Lluís Domènech i Montaner in the modernist Art Nouveau movement that was very popular in Barcelona in that period. Palau de la Música Catalana (pictured), a concert hall, is a steel-framed building that uses natural light in an innovative way, while the Hospital de Sant Pau combines the aesthetic value with the needs of the patients. A minor boundary modification took place in 2008.
San Millán Yuso and Suso Monasteries	An old monastery building near the slope of a hill	La Rioja	1997	805; ii, iv, vi (cultural)	The Suso (upper) monastery was founded in the mid-6th century. Initially occupied by cenobitic monks who lived in caves, the complex was later expanded to include a Romanesque church (pictured) and a new monastery, Yuso (lower), was constructed in the 16th century. The monasteries were an important spiritual and cultural centre of northern Spain. In the 9th and 10th centuries, the Glosas Emilianenses were written at Suso, containing the first written examples of the Spanish and Basque languages.
Rock Art of the Mediterranean Basin on the Iberian Peninsula	Deer painting in cave	several sites	1998	874; iii (cultural)	The site includes over 750 examples of rock art from the late prehistoric period, which feature images ranging from geometric shapes to scenes of men hunting animals or battles. There is also a scene depicting collection of honey. They provide a glimpse into the life of prehistoric societies and illustrate their activities and beliefs.
University and Historic Precinct of Alcalá de Henares	A Renaissance building of the University of Alcalá	Madrid	1998	876; ii, iv, vi (cultural)	Alcalá de Henares was founded by the Romans as Complutum and grew in the medieval times. At the beginning of the 16th century, Cardinal Cisneros founded the University of Alcalá here. It became the first example of a planned university city, serving as a model to other European universities and Spanish missionaries in America. The city is the birthplace of Miguel de Cervantes, the author of Don Quixote, known for his contributions to the Spanish language and Western literature.
Ibiza, Biodiversity and Culture	Ibiza Upper Town located on a cliff above the sea	Balearic Islands	1999	417rev; ii, iii, iv, ix, x (mixed)	The Upper Town of Ibiza (pictured) and its fortifications from the 16th century are a prominent example of Renaissance military architecture and were influential in the development of Spanish settlements in the New World. There are also remains of fortification from earlier periods, as well as ruins of a Punic settlement Sa Caleta and its necropolis Puig des Molins. From the natural perspective, the sea is home to seagrass meadows of Posidonia oceanica, only found in the Mediterranean, that supports a diverse coastal and marine ecosystem.
San Cristóbal de La Laguna	People sitting on benches on a town square	Canary Islands	1999	929; ii, iv (cultural)	The city, located on the island of Tenerife, was founded by the Spanish in the late 15th century. It has an unplanned Upper Town and a Lower Town that follows a grid plan. It was Spain's first non-fortified colonial town and served as a model for urban development in the Americas. There are several religious, public, and private buildings from the 16th to 18th century. Plaza del Adelantado, the main square, is pictured.
Archaeological Ensemble of Tárraco	A Roman Aqueduct of Tárraco	Catalonia	2000	875rev; ii, iii (cultural)	Tárraco (modern-day Tarragona), founded in the 3rd century BCE, served as the capital of the Roman provinces of Hispania Citerior and later Hispania Tarraconensis. Most remains are only fragments or preserved under more modern buildings. The amphitheatre was constructed in the 2nd century CE. The Roman Les Ferreres Aqueduct is pictured.
Palmeral of Elche	Two rainbows above a palm grove	Valencian Community	2000	930; ii, v (cultural)	The grove of date palm trees, as well as pomegranate and alfalfa, was developed under the Moors in the 10th century. They also constructed an elaborate irrigation systems. The palmeral is a rare example of an agricultural landscape typical of North Africa brought to Europe.
Roman Walls of Lugo	Roman stone walls of Lugo	Galicia	2000	987; iv (cultural)	The Romans built walls to protect the town of Lucus, today Lugo, in the 3rd century. The walls remain entirely intact and are the best remaining example of Roman military fortification in Western Europe. They have numerous towers, gates, staircases, and they surrounded by a moat.
Catalan Romanesque Churches of the Vall de Boí	A stone Romanesque church with a prominent bell tower in a mountain setting	Catalonia	2000	988; ii, iv (cultural)	This site comprises nine Romanesque chruches, constructed in La Vall de Boí in the Pyrenees in the 12th century. They represent a local variant of the Lombard Romanesque, demonstrating the exchange of cultures across medieval Europe. The church of Sant Climent is pictured.
Archaeological Site of Atapuerca	Archaeological site with people working on excavations	Castile and León	2000	989; iii, v (cultural)	The Atapuerca Mountains were inhabited by different communities of early humans over a period of nearly one million years. Today, the archaeological sites contain fossil remains of some of the earliest presence of early humans in Europe. The more recent findings date to the early common era and the medieval times. There are also art objects such as engraved panels and sculptures.
Aranjuez Cultural Landscape	Royal Palace behind a pond and some trees	Madrid	2001	1044; ii, iv (cultural)	Since its establishment as a Royal Estate in the 16th century, Aranjuez has developed in a cultural landscape combining various influences and in turn influencing the trends in landscape design. The complex comprises the Royal Palace (pictured in the background), forests, groves, French gardens from the 18th century, water elements such as lakes, ponds, and ditches, as well as plant nurseries and orchards. In the 20th century, it was opened to the public.
Renaissance Monumental Ensembles of Úbeda and Baeza	Renaissance square and a church with a decorated facade	Andalusia	2003	522rev; ii, iv (cultural)	The two small cities with roots in Moorish and post-Reconquista times were the sites of a major renovations in the 16th century under the architect Andrés de Vandelvira. This reconstruction brought the humanistic ideas and the emerging Renaissance style from Italy to Spain. These concepts were then highly influential both in Spain and in Latin America. The Vázquez de Molina Square with the Holy Chapel of the Savior in Úbeda, the greatest Renaissance complex in Spain, is pictured.
Vizcaya Bridge	A transporter bridge crossing a river, with houses on both banks	Basque Country	2006	1217; i, ii (cultural)	The world's first transporter bridge was constructed by Alberto Palacio to cross the Nervion without disrupting maritime traffic to the Port of Bilbao. This type of bridge uses a high suspended gondola to carry people and traffic. It was completed in 1893 and then served as a model for bridges in Europe, Africa, and the Americas, although only a few survive today. The bridge, known for its minimalist aesthetics and functionality, used several pioneering technologies of the Second Industrial Revolution with the use of steel cables and iron making technology.
Teide National Park	A volcanic mountain and a rock formation on the left	Canary Islands	2007	1258; vii, viii (natural)	The park is located on the island of Tenerife. It is dominated by the volcano Mount Teide, Spain's highest peak with an altitude of 3,178 m (10,427 ft). With its numerous geological formations, the park is important in history of geology and geomorphology. Teide and Roque Cinchado, a rock formation, are pictured.
Tower of Hercules	A large lighthouse made of stone	Galicia	2009	1312; iii (cultural)	The 55 m (180 ft) lighthouse was built in the 1st century CE by the Romans to mark the entrance to the A Coruña harbor. It was substantially restored in the 18th century while still preserving its Roman core. It is the only lighthouse from the classical antiquity to have retained structural integrity and remained in a continuous use.
Prehistoric Rock Art Sites in the Côa Valley and Siega Verde*	Rock carving depicting a bull	Castile and León	2010	866bis; i, iii (cultural)	The two prehistoric rock art sites, Côa Valley (in Portugal, originally listed independently in 1998) and Siega Verde in Spain, added in 2010, contain thousands of rock carvings depicting especially animals. They were created over several millennia, from the Upper Paleolithic to the Magdalenian, 22.000 – 8.000 BCE.
Cultural Landscape of the Serra de Tramuntana	A village on a steep slope with several trees and other plants	Balearic Islands	2011	1371; ii, iv, v (cultural)	The cultural landscape is a result of millennia of work by local farmers who transformed steep coastal slopes to agricultural terraces and networks of water works. It combines the water management techniques of Arabs, such as qanats (underground channels), and feudal organization of the land, brought by the Spanish. Farms produce vegetables, fruits, and olives. There are several villages in the area; Deià is pictured.
Heritage of Mercury. Almadén and Idrija*	A wooden cart in a mine shaft	Castile-La Mancha	2012	1313; ii, iv (cultural)	This site comprises the heritage of two largest mercury mines in Europe, Idrija in Slovenia and Almadén (shaft pictured) in Spain. The latter was already operational in the ancient times while mercury was discovered in Idrija in 1490. They became especially important because mercury was used for extraction of silver from the deposits in the Americas. In Almadén, the heritage sites include Retamar Castle, religious buildings, mining university, a hospital, and traditional dwellings.
Antequera Dolmens Site	Inside of a dolmen, with several large stone supporting the roof	Andalusia	2016	1501; i, iii, iv (cultural)	Antequera has some of the most important megalithic monuments of Neolithic and Bronze Age Europe: the Dolmen of Menga (pictured), Dolmen de Viera, and Tholos de El Romeral. The orientation of these monuments is aligned with two natural features which are also the components of this site, the rock formation of Peña de los Enamorados and the El Torcal mountain range.
Ancient and Primeval Beech Forests of the Carpathians and Other Regions of Europe*	Landscape with forests and a river	Castile and León, Navarre, Castile-La Mancha, Community of Madrid	2017	1133ter; ix (natural)	This transnational site, shared among 18 European countries, demonstrate the postglacial expansion process of such forests and exhibit the most complete and comprehensive ecological patterns and processes of pure and mixed stands of European beech across a variety of environmental conditions. The site was originally listed in 2007 and expanded four times. Six forests in Spain, including the Tejera Negra (pictured), were added to the list in 2017.
Caliphate City of Medina Azahara	Reception hall in a palace, with several horseshoe arches	Andalusia	2018	1560; iii, iv (cultural)	Medina Azahara was established in the 10th century by the Umayyad dynasty as the capital of the newly-founded Caliphate of Córdoba. It was a prosperous city until it got sacked and abandoned during the civil war at the beginning of the 11th century. The ruins were rediscovered in the early 20th century and provide an exceptional view into the life, technology, and culture of the Umayyad society. The reception hall of caliph Abd al-Rahman III is pictured.
Risco Caído and the sacred mountains of Gran Canaria Cultural Landscape	Rock formation with a human made wall, cacti and other plants around	Canary Islands	2019	1578; iii, v (cultural)	The archaeological sites on the island of Gran Canaria are associated with the people of Berber origin that arrived to the island probably around the beginnign of the Common Era and have been developing in total isolation until the arrival of the Spanish in the 15th century. The sites include cave dwellings, rock art images, water management systems, and sacred sites.
Paseo del Prado and Buen Retiro, a landscape of Arts and Sciences	A large equestrian monument and a large lake in front	Madrid	2020	1500; ii, iv, vi (cultural)	The two sites demonstrate the development of urban spaces following the ideas of the Enlightenment. Paseo del Prado, originating in the 16th and modified in the 18th century, is a prototype alameda (a tree-lined avenue) that was consequently influential in urban development in Spain and Latin America. Along the avenue, there are buildings associated with arts (including the Museo del Prado), science, research, industry, and healthcare. A botanical garden is also a part of the property. A monument and one of the lakes in the Buen Retiro park are pictured.
Talayotic Menorca	A circular structure made of large stones	Balearic Islands	2023	1528; iii, iv (cultural)	This property comprises nine archaeological sites of the Talaiotic culture that existed in the island of Menorca between the second millennium to the early first millennium BCE, corresponding to Bronze Age to Late Iron Age. The culture is named after talaiots, large cone-shaped structures, generally truncated (example pictured). Other megalithic structures include hypogea (artificial caves), enclosures, circular houses, and dry stone walls.

== Tentative list ==
In addition to sites inscribed on the World Heritage List, member states can maintain a list of tentative sites that they may consider for nomination. Nominations for the World Heritage List are only accepted if the site was previously listed on the tentative list. As of 2026, Spain recorded 35 sites on its tentative list.

Tentative sites
Site	Image	Location (Community)	Year listed	UNESCO criteria	Description
Romanesque Cultural Enclave in the North of Castile-León and the South of Cantabria	A Romanesque church with an unpolished facade	Cantabria, Castile and León	1998	ii, iv, v (cultural)	This nomination comprises a number of monuments in the Romanesque style, located in the valleys of the Pisuerga and Ebro rivers and dating from the 11th to the 13th centuries. The Church of Saint Martin of Tours in Frómista is pictured.
Bulwarked Frontier Fortifications	Bastion walls	Aragon, Castile and León, Catalonia, Extremadura, Navarre	1998	ii, iii, iv (cultural)	This site comprises several border fortifications built between the end of the 16th century or start of the 17th century and the end of the 18th century following the military conflicts with France and Portugal. A characteristic feature of these towns are the bastions that have been developed as a response to the increased use of artillery in warfare. The walls of Pamplona are pictured.
The Silver Route	Ruins of a Roman bridge with three preserved arches	Castile and León, Extremadura	1998	ii, iii, iv, v (cultural)	This road started as a Roman road from Mérida to Astorga. Along the route, there are remains of post relays and inns, at regular distances. Some of the bridges of the road are still in use while others are in ruin. The Alconétar Bridge is pictured.
Mediterranean Windmills	An old windmill without sails attached	Murcia, Castilla-La Mancha, Valencian Community	1998	ii, iii, iv, v (cultural)	Windmills became common in the region in the 12th and 13th centuries. In the 19th and 20th centuries, they got gradually abandoned because of technological development, but some are still in use. Several windmills are located at the Campo de Cartagena (example pictured).
Greek Archaeological ensemble in Empúries, l'Escala, Girona	Remains of an ancient temple	Catalonia	2002	iii, iv (cultural)	Emporion was established by the Greeks from Phocaea in the 6th century BCE as a twin settlement, comprising the "old city" Paliapolis and "new city" Neapolis. The latter was abandoned already in the antiquity, which helped to preserve the layout of the town. In 218 BCE, during the Second Punic War, the Romans landed here and annexed the area after the war. This resulted in a popular revolt. The Romans established a military base that later developed into a city. Today, the remains of both Greek and Roman settlements are preserved. Remains of a temple to Serapis are pictured.
The Ribeira Sacra, Lugo and Ourense	And old monastery with red roof in a valley	Galicia	1996	ii, iii, iv, v (cultural)	The area is set along the rivers of Miño and Sil. There are numerous monasteries here, including San Esteban de Atan, Santa Cristina de Ribas de Sil, San Esteban de Chouzan, and San Esteban de Ribas de Sil (pictured).
The Mediterranean Facet of the Pyrenees (France-Spain)*	Landscape with a vineyard and a mountain in the background	Catalonia	2004	ii, iv, v, vii, ix, x (mixed)	This nomination, shared with France, comprises the area where the Pyrenees meet the Mediterranean Sea. The cultural landscape has been shaped by humans since the antiquity. There are coastal vineyards. The landscape inspired several artists of the 20th century. The Albera Massif in France is pictured.
Mesta Livestock Trails	Landscape with a drovers' road	Castile and León	2007	v, vi (cultural)	Mesta was a livestock farming guild that regulated and maintained an interconnected network of drovers' roads (called cañadas, cordeles, and veredas in Spain), used for transhumance, a cyclical migration of livestock between summer and winter pastures. It dates back to the 13th century and today the network is protected by modern laws. A section near Segovia is pictured.
Roman Ways. Itineraries of the Roman Empire	Remains of a Roman arch	several sites	2007	i, ii, iv, v, vi (cultural)	Roman roads connected the Roman Empire and were used to transport supplies, people, or military equipment. Construction involved several technological innovations, including bridges and tunnels. There was also infrastructure to assist the travelers along these roads, such as inns and public baths. The Arch of Cabanes on Via Augusta in the Valencian Community is pictured.
Ancares – Somiedo	Mountain landscape with farm huts with thatched roofs	Asturias, Galicia, Castile and León	2007	v, vii, ix, x (mixed)	The two mountainous areas have traditionally relied on transhumance, with a type of summer pasture called a braña. The Camino de Santiago runs along the Serra dos Ancares. Mountain huts in Somiedo are pictured.
Loarre Castle	A castle with some towers above a plain	Aragon	2007	iv (cultural)	The castle was built in the 11th century under Sancho the Great and Sancho Ramírez. It is a prominent example of the Romanesque architecture and has remained well preserved in its original layout.
El Ferrol of the Illustration Historical Heritage	A church in the classicist style	Galicia	2007	i, ii, iii, iv (cultural)	The city of Ferrol is located on a strategic position in the Ferrol estuary. In the 18th and 19th centuries, during the Age of Enlightenment, the city saw several construction projects in the Neoclassical style. The ensembles include the Arsenal of the Spanish Navy, the Civil Arsenal, urban areas, and defenses. The Church of San Francisco is pictured.
Mining Historical Heritage	An elevator above a mining shaft	several sites	2007	i, ii, iv (cultural)	This nomination comprises 17 mining complexes in different parts of Spain and from different time periods. Since the nomination, the mine in Almadén has been listed as a World Heritage site in 2012. The mine in Villanueva del Río y Minas is pictured.
Plasencia - Monfragüe - Trujillo: Mediterranean landscape	River and rock formations	Extremadura	2009	ii, iv, v, x (mixed)	The cities of Plasencia and Trujillo are significant in view of urban plan and several buildings in medieval and Renaissance styles. The architects from Trujillo, including Francisco Becerra and Martín Casillas, were influential in bringing the Spanish trends to the Americas. Monfragüe (pictured) is a national park and is important in its rich wildlife, especially birds.
Jaén Cathedral (extension of the Renaissance Monumental Ensembles of Úbeda and Baeza)	Front view of a cathedral in Renaissance style with two bell towers	Andalusia	2012	i, ii, iv (cultural)	The cathedral, together with the two already listed urban ensembles, is a prominent example of Spanish Renaissance architecture of the 16th century. It was designed by the architect Andrés de Vandelvira. Even if the construction lasted for centuries, the stonemasons closely followed the original plans.
Valle Salado de Añana	A village with salt evaporation terraces	Basque Country	2012	iii, iv, v (cultural)	Salt has been extracted in the area since the prehistoric times. Over millennia, the valley has developed into a cultural landscape with brine springs, salt evaporation ponds, terraces, and channels.
La Rioja and Rioja Alavesa Vine and Wine Cultural Landscape	A village with a vineyard in front	Basque Country, La Rioja	2013	i, iii, v, vi (cultural)	The area along the Ebro river has been associated with viticulture for over two millennia. This resulted in a cultural landscape with vineyards, villages, and wine cellars. The high-quality wines produced here have the Qualified Designation of Origin label. The village of Entrena is pictured.
Priorat-Montsant-Siurana agricultural landscape of the Mediterranean mountain	Rugged hills and a monastery in front	Catalonia	2014	v, vi (cultural)	The cultural landscape demonstrates the adaptation of communities that have inhabited the rugged mountainous terrain for millennia. The area is appropriate for small-scale agriculture. Cartoixa d'Escaladei (pictured) was the first monastery of the Carthusians in the Iberian peninsula and was important in spreading the technology and culture.
The Portal of the Ripoll Monastery	Church portal in Romanesque style with several decorative statues	Catalonia	2015	ii, iii, vi (cultural)	The portal of the church dates to the 12th century. It is one of the best examples of Romanesque architecture in Catalonia and in Europe in general. It features numerous stone reliefs that depict Biblical scenes, earning it the nickname "the stone Bible".
Turó de la Seu Vella de Lleida	An old cathedral with a prominent bell tower	Catalonia	2016	ii, iv, vi (cultural)	The Old Cathedral (pictured) of Lleida was built in the Romanesque style in the 13th century with a cloister added in the following century in the Gothic style. Lleida was an important city of the Crown of Aragon and the University of Lleida was the first university established in the Iberian Peninsula. The complex also includes the remains of the Castle of La Suda and fortifications. At the beginning of the 18th century, the complex changed function and became military barracks. In the 20th century, restoration started.
Monastery of Santa María de La Rábida and the Columbus Memorial Places in Huelva	Entrance building to a monastery, white-washed walls	Andalusia	2016	ii, iii, vi (cultural)	The monastery (pictured) was founded in 1412 and built in the Gothic-Mudejar style. Christopher Columbus stayed here while planning his voyage and his three ships set sails from Palos de la Frontera in August 1492. There are several monuments dedicated to Columbus and the discovery of the Americas in the area.
Church of San Salvador de Valdediós	A church in the pre-Romanesque style	Asturias	2017	ii, ii, iv (cultural)	This is a proposed extension to the site Monuments of Oviedo and the Kingdom of the Asturias, originally listed in 1985 and expanded in 1998 to cover important monuments of pre-Romanesque Asturian architecture. The Church of San Salvador de Valdediós was consecrated in 893 but some parts are even older.
The Olive Grove Landscapes of Andalusia	Extensive olive grove	Andalusia	2017	iii, v, vi (cultural)	This nomination comprises 15 representative cultural landscapes with olive groves (a grove near Montefrío pictured). Andalusia is Spain's main region for olive oil production, with history dating back at least to the time of the Romans. These landscapes combine different aspects of olive growing, including planting, irrigation, management, and processing.
The Wine in Iberia	Archaeological site with remains of a building	Andalusia, Valencian Community, Murcia	2018	ii, iii, iv (cultural)	This nomination comprises several archaeological sites related to early cultivation of wine. They include the remains of a Phoenician settlement at Doña Blanca (pictured) that was occupied between the 8th and 3rd centuries BCE, Phoenician shipwrecks of Mazarrón, Bajo de la Campana Phoenician shipwreck where amphorae to carry wine were found, and remains of stone wine presses.

== See also ==
- List of Intangible Cultural Heritage elements in Spain
