= Andalusian patio =

Open-air courtyard style popular in south Spain

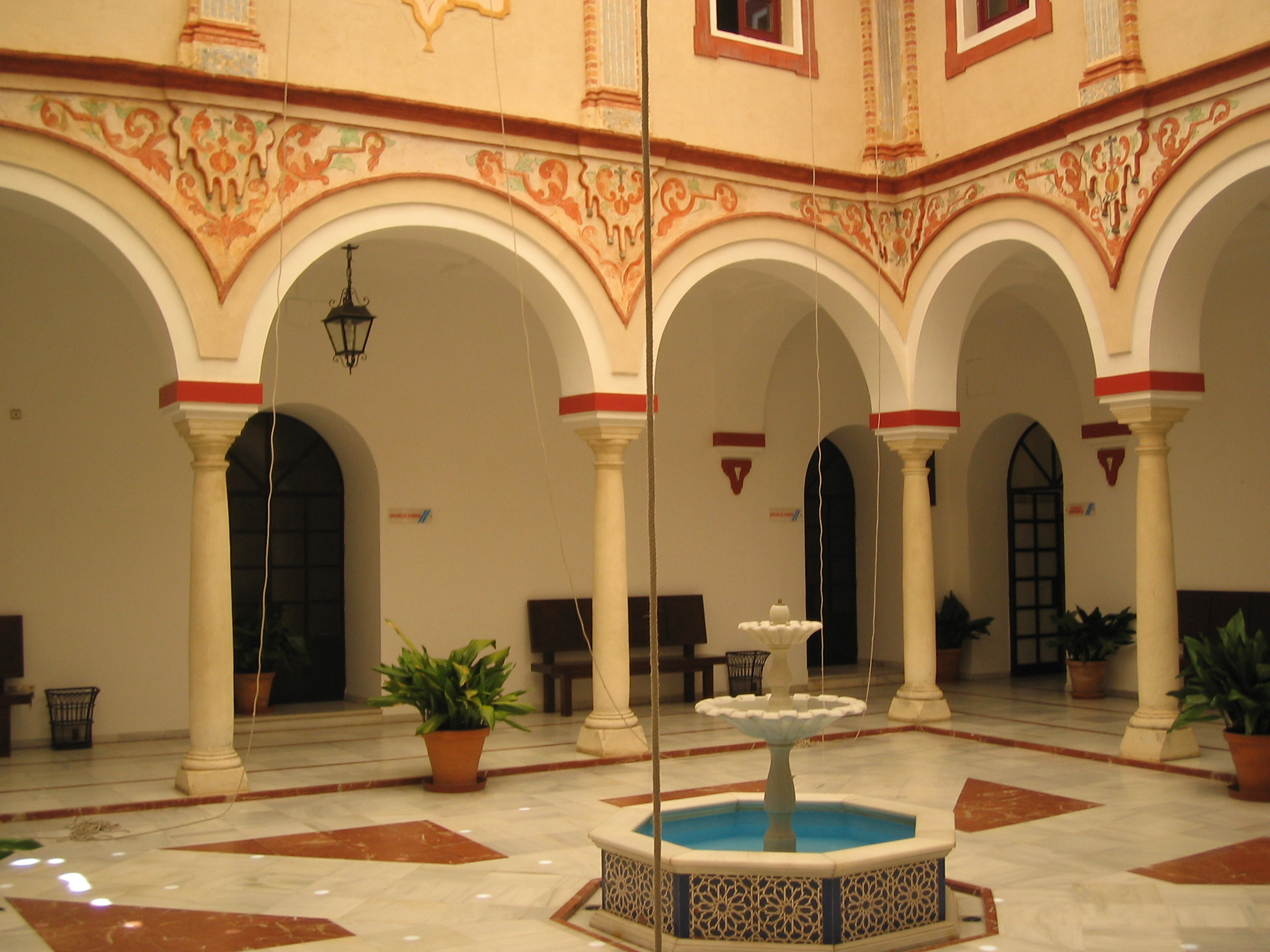
Typical patio of Sevillan houses.

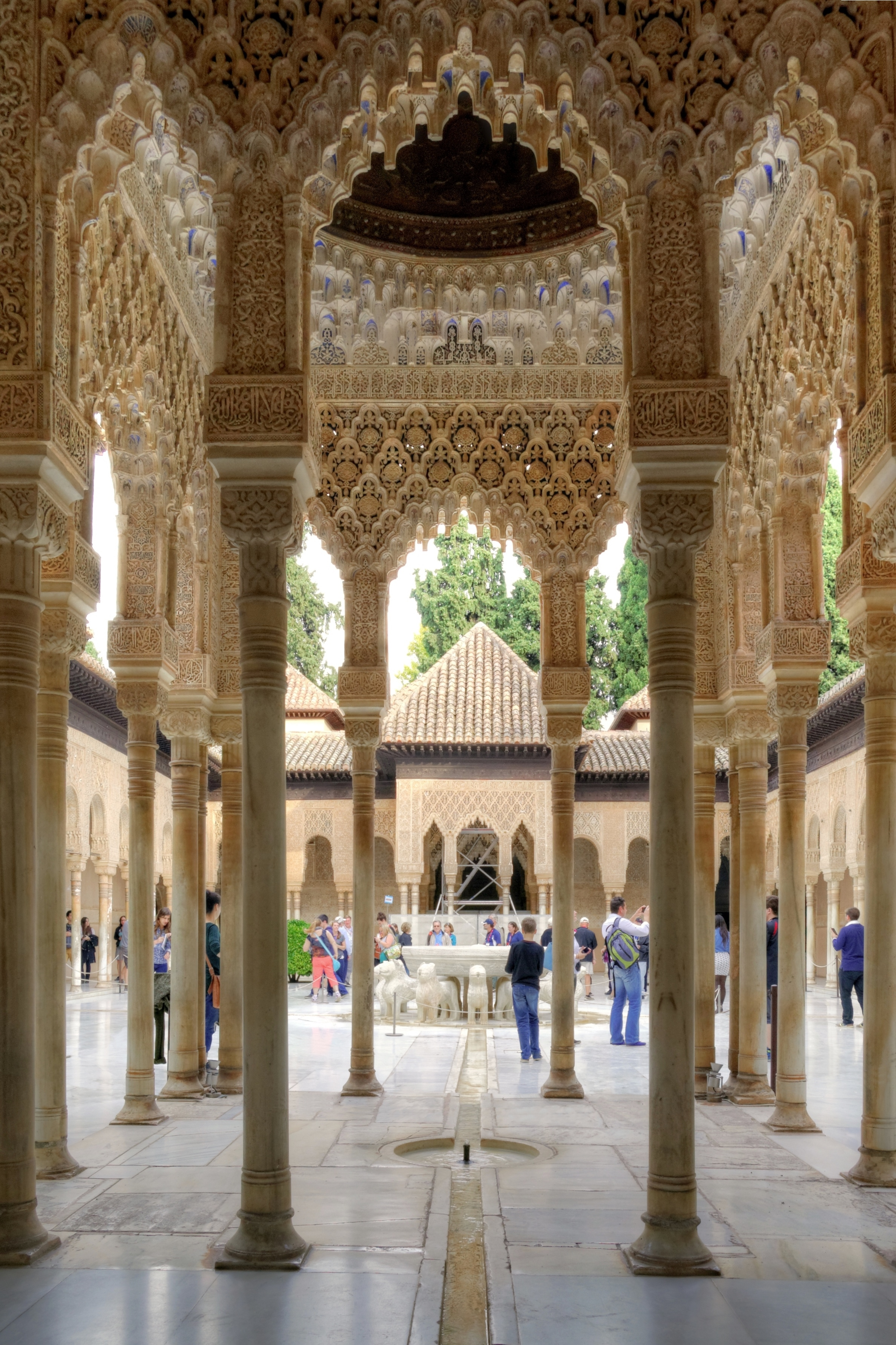
Patio de los Leones (Courtyard of the Lions), The Alhambra of Granada.

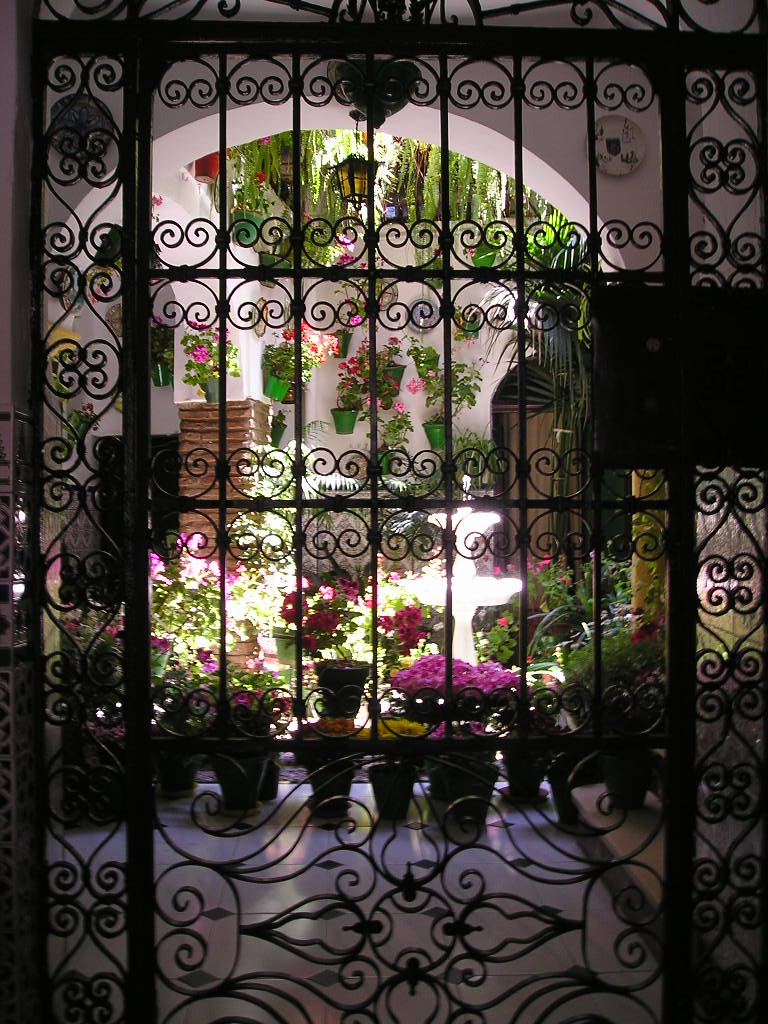
Patio of Córdoba.

Andalusian patios are central open spaces in the courtyard houses of the south of Spain. In Andalusia, the fusion of Roman and Islamic architectural traditions gave rise to a distinct patio culture, conceived as the heart of the home and a space for social gatherings. This tradition remains alive in many Andalusian towns, where every spring festivals and competitions are held to preserve and adorn them. Notable examples include the Córdoba Patio Competition and the Roodmas (fiestas de la Cruz de Mayo), which take place in various cities and towns across the region.

The stone patios are an architectural evolution of the Roman atrium. The patios feature all types of decoration, but the most significant elements are the plants placed around them and along their walls, creating an environment evoking an idyllic garden. The practice of placing such a large number of plants originally had a religious purpose, such as making offerings to the gods or honoring the deceased. Each person would choose the plant that represented their offering and place it somewhere in the patio. In this way, a profusion of beautiful flowers and plants gradually came to adorn the patio. These plants were also used to conceal the damage that, over time, appeared on the walls or in other areas of the patio, thus covering all the empty spaces in the walls. For them, the art of landscaping was the art of deceiving the eye, bringing nature into the interiors of homes and allowing inhabitants to escape urban life by surrounding them with an environment of peace and tranquility.

== Background ==
It has long been customary to decorate houses and palaces with large open spaces and gardens dominated by fragrant flowers, fountains, canals, wells, ponds, frescoes with mythological scenes, and marble medallions (on walls), forming ornate but harmonious shapes with the intention to represent the Garden of the Paradise as imagined by the Classical and Muslim architects.

There are countless examples throughout the region of Andalusia, notably in the historical quarter of Córdoba where "Fiesta of the patios" is celebrated. These patio houses are communal, family or multifamily dwellings or sets of individual houses with the shared patio. As a characteristic cultural space boasts an abundant array of plants, and during the fiesta inhabitants can share food and wine, and freely welcome all visitors to admire their beauty and the skill involved in their creation. The patios also host traditional singing, flamenco guitar playing and dancing.

== Architecture ==
As trends evolved, the addition of windows, fences (in wrought iron or wood), balconies and other viewpoints into the garden from inside the house became commonplace. Some of these were designed to give a view of the patio while obscuring the viewer from outside observers.

== See also ==
- Terrace
- Generalife
- Sahn, the equivalent within the wider tradition of Muslim architecture.
- Roman atrium
- Riad
