= Salt Valley of Añana =

Salt evaporation pond in the Basque Country, Spain

- Valle salado de Añana (Spanish); Añanako gatz harana (Basque)
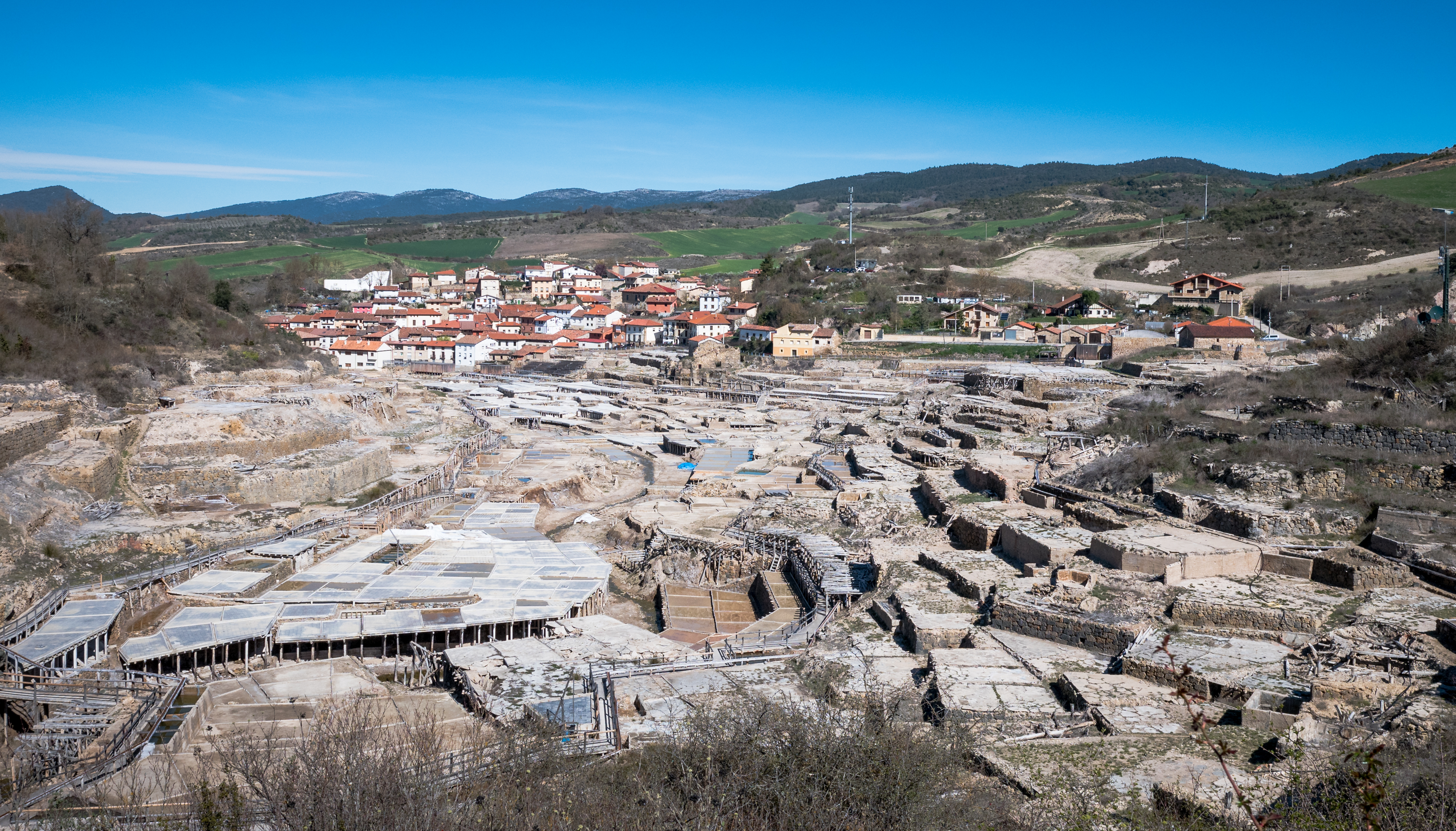
- View of the valley, with Salinas de Añana in the background
- Interactive map of Salt Valley of Añana
- Location: Añana, Álava, Basque Country, Spain
- Coordinates: 42.79954°N 2.98524°W
- Type: Salt evaporation pond
- Surface area: 13 ha (32 acres)

Ramsar Wetland
- Designated: 24 October 2002
- Part of: Lago de Caicedo-Yuso y Salinas de Añana
- Reference no.: 1258

Spanish Cultural Heritage
- Designated: 17 July 1984
- Reference no.: RI-51-0005132

The Salt Valley of Añana (Basque: Añanako gatz harana, Spanish: Valle salado de Añana) is an inland salt evaporation pond in Salinas de Añana, Basque Country, Spain. The salty water emerges from four springs located in the head of the valley, which is then diverted to numerous ponds and left to evaporate. The oldest evidence of salt extraction at the valley dates from the Neolithic. During the 20th century, the lower cost of marine salt production resulted in the near abandonment of the facilities. Since the late 20th century the valley is being gradually restored.

== History ==
The oldest evidence of salt extraction at the valley dates from about 7000 years ago, in the Neolithic. The evaporation of water was achieved by heating the water in ceramic pottery. During Roman times, salt ponds for evaporation were introduced. Salinas de Añana, a settlement which grew next to the valley, was granted town status in 1140. In 1564 a salt monopoly was established by Philip II, meaning that salt production in the valley had to be carried out according to strict rules given by the authorities. The water channeling system was completely overhauled in 1801, improving the efficiency of salt production. In 1869 the monopoly was terminated, reverting control of the works to the locals.

During the early 20th century, new materials like concrete were introduced, while the number of ponds increased. The profitability of salt production fell drastically in the second half of the 20th century. This led to the near abandonment of salt production, and the structures of the valley fell into disrepair. The site was declared a Bien de Interés Cultural in 1984 by the Spanish government. Around this time an ongoing recovery process began. In 2012, the valley was added to the World Heritage tentative list.
