= Council of Wise Men of the plain of Murcia =

Cultural property in Murcia, Spain

- Date: Thursdays
- Frequency: Weekly
- Venue: City Hall of Murcia
- Locations: Murcia, Spain
- Inaugurated: 1848

Irrigators' tribunals of the Spanish Mediterranean coast: the Council of Wise Men of the plain of Murcia and the Water Tribunal of the plain of Valencia
- UNESCO Intangible Cultural Heritage
- Country: Spain
- Reference: 00171
- Region: Europe and North America

Inscription history
- Inscription: 2009 (4th session)
- List: Representative

The Council of Wise Men of the plain of Murcia (Spanish: Consejo de Hombres Buenos, pronounced [konˈse.xo ðe ˈom.bɾes ˈβwe.nos]) is a customary court which is responsible for resolving irrigation conflicts in the plain of Murcia (Huerta de Murcia).

In 2009 it was chosen along with the Water Tribunal of the plain of Valencia as an intangible cultural heritage by UNESCO.

== Council function ==
The judgments of the Council of Wise Men are oral, being usual that a scribe records the statements.

The Council of Wise Men's aim is to rule on and resolve issues outlined in the ordinances of the plains. These include issues such as the repair of irrigation systems.

It consists of five full members and five attorneys. It is chaired by the Mayor or his delegate. He has a decisive vote in case of a tie, as rulings are decided by simple majority, and is responsible for carrying out the resolutions. He also has the authority to fine members who do not attend the meetings.

The Council holds its hearings in public every Thursday in the salon of the city hall of Murcia, from nine until noon.
