= Castle of Doña Blanca =

- Castillo de Doña Blanca (Spanish)
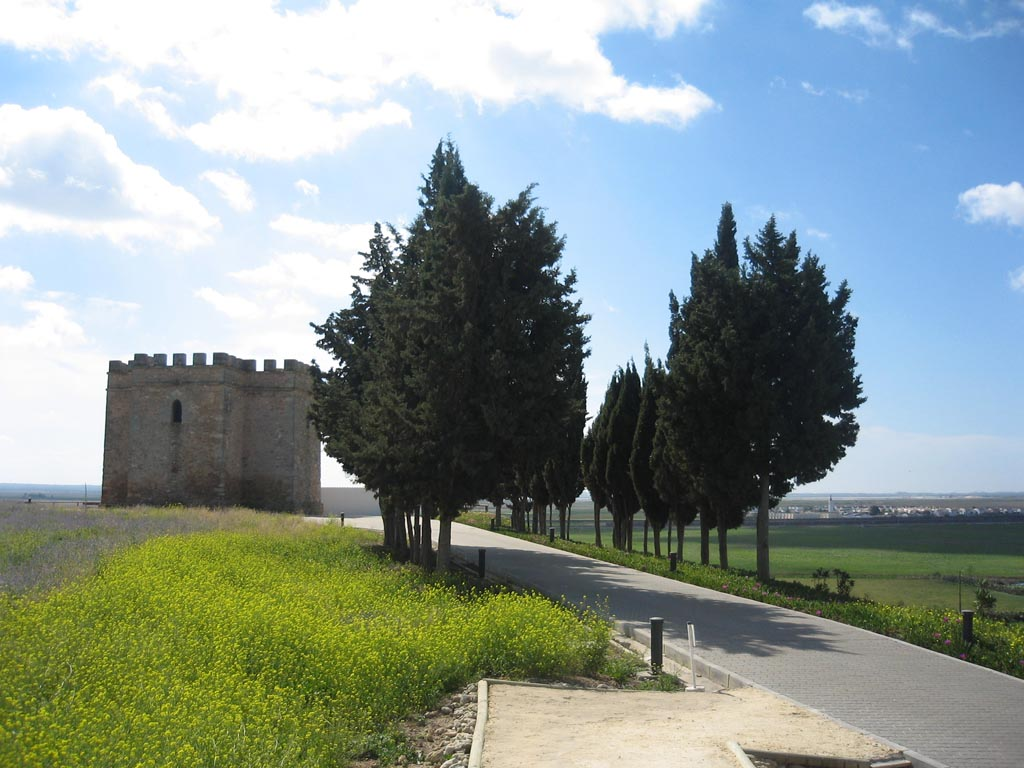

- Location within Spain
- 36.627857°N 6.161585°W
- Location: Puerto de Santa María, Spain

Spanish Cultural Heritage
- Official name: Castillo de Doña Blanca
- Type: Non-movable
- Criteria: Monument
- Designated: 1993
- Reference no.: RI-51-0007619

The Castle of Doña Blanca (Spanish: Castillo de Doña Blanca) is a castle located in Puerto de Santa María, Spain. It was declared Bien de Interés Cultural in 1993.
