= Water Tribunal of the plain of Valencia =

Institution of justice

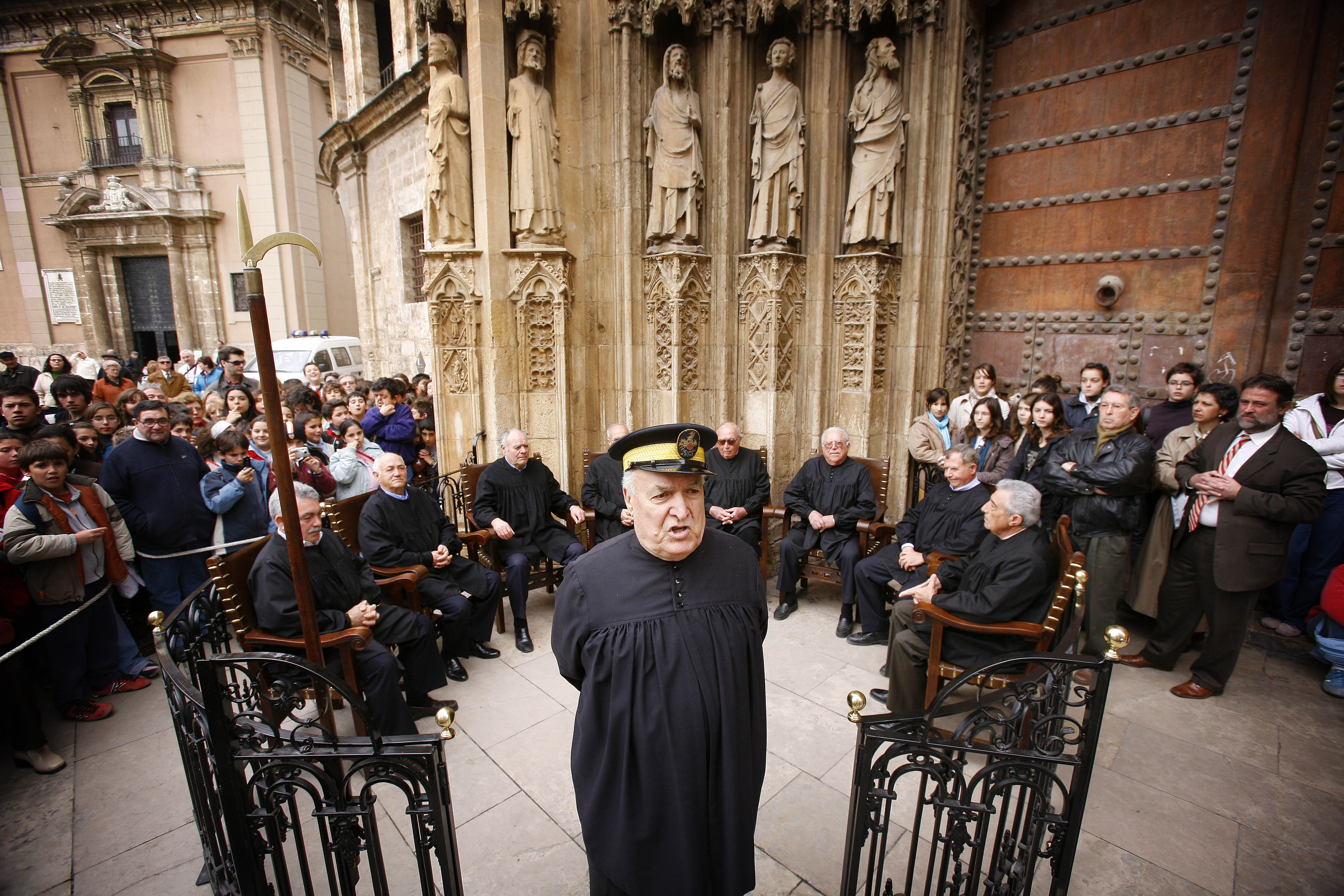
- The Tribunal de les Aigües of Valencia in 2006
- Date: Thursdays
- Begins: 10th CE
- Frequency: Weekly
- Venue: Casa Vestuari
- Locations: Valencia, Spain
- Founders: Abd-ar-Rahman III, Al-Hakam II

Irrigators' tribunals of the Spanish Mediterranean coast: the Council of Wise Men of the plain of Murcia and the Water Tribunal of the plain of Valencia
- UNESCO Intangible Cultural Heritage
- Country: Spain
- Reference: 00171
- Region: Europe and North America

Inscription history
- Inscription: 2009 (4th session)
- List: Representative

The Water Tribunal of the plain of Valencia, also known as the Tribunal of Waters (Valencian: Tribunal de les Aigües de la Vega de València), is an institution of justice to settle disputes arising from the use of irrigation water by farmers in several Irrigation Communities (Valencian: Comunitats de Regants) and canals (Quart, Benàger i Faitanar, Tormos, Mislata, Mestalla, Favara, Rascanya, Rovella and Xirivella) in the Horta de València. It is the world's oldest court and the oldest democratic institution in Europe.

In 2009 it was chosen along with the Council of Wise Men of the plain of Murcia as intangible cultural heritage by UNESCO.

== Proceedings of the Tribunal ==
The Tribunal is a customary court. It consists of one representative, called síndic (syndic), from each of the Irrigation Communities—nine in total—and one among them is elected president for a period of two years. Every Thursday, the Tribunal meets in public and an administrative session at the Casa Vestidor at the Plaça de la Mare de Déu of Valencia to discuss various issues, mainly the distribution of water.

On public holidays that fall on a Thursday, the Water Court meets on the preceding Wednesday. That is when the bailiff, with the permission of the president, calls for cases from each of the canals in turn, with the traditional phrase "denunciants de la séquia de...!" ("claimants from the irrigation canal of...!"). The trial takes place quickly and is completely in Valencian.

Each complainant puts his case before the Tribunal and then the accused defends himself and answers questions. It is then when the Tribunal, with the exception of the trustee of the canal in question (to ensure fairness) decides the guilt of the defendant, and if so found, it is the trustee of the canal who imposes the penalty for the offender, according to the Bylaws of the Irrigation Communities (Valencian: Ordenances de la pròpia Comunitat de Regants). The court is purely oral—there is nothing done in writing and no records are kept.

== History ==
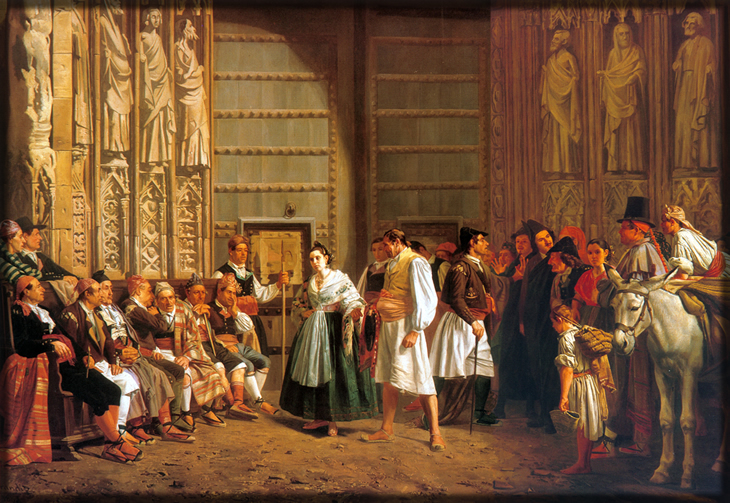
Tribunal de las Aguas by Bernardo Ferrándiz, 1865

The Tribunal is one of the oldest legal institutions in Europe still in operation, with roots dating back to the 10th century.

Established during the Islamic period, its purpose was to resolve disputes over water distribution in the region's séquia irrigation network, designed to supply water from the Turia River to Valencia's agricultural fields. The Tribunal's continuity and efficacy underscores its historical significance in managing water resources for agriculture in the region.

It was founded during the Muslim Spain reigns of the Caliphs Abd-ar-Rahman III and Al-Hakam II, specifically in 960 CE. Fransisco Borrull's reason was that during the reign of these two Caliphs there was an era of complete peace on the Iberian peninsula and, as a result, it must have been founded then.

The millennial anniversary of the founding of the Water Tribunal took place in 1960, led by Vicente Giner Boira, legal adviser to the Tribunal at the time, and a leading proponent of this theory in the twentieth century.

King James I of Aragon formalised the tribunal in the 13th Century, and it was added to the Spanish legal system in 1978.

== See also ==
- Council of Wise Men of the plain of Murcia
