= Courtyards Festival of Córdoba =

Courtyard competition in Córdoba, Spain

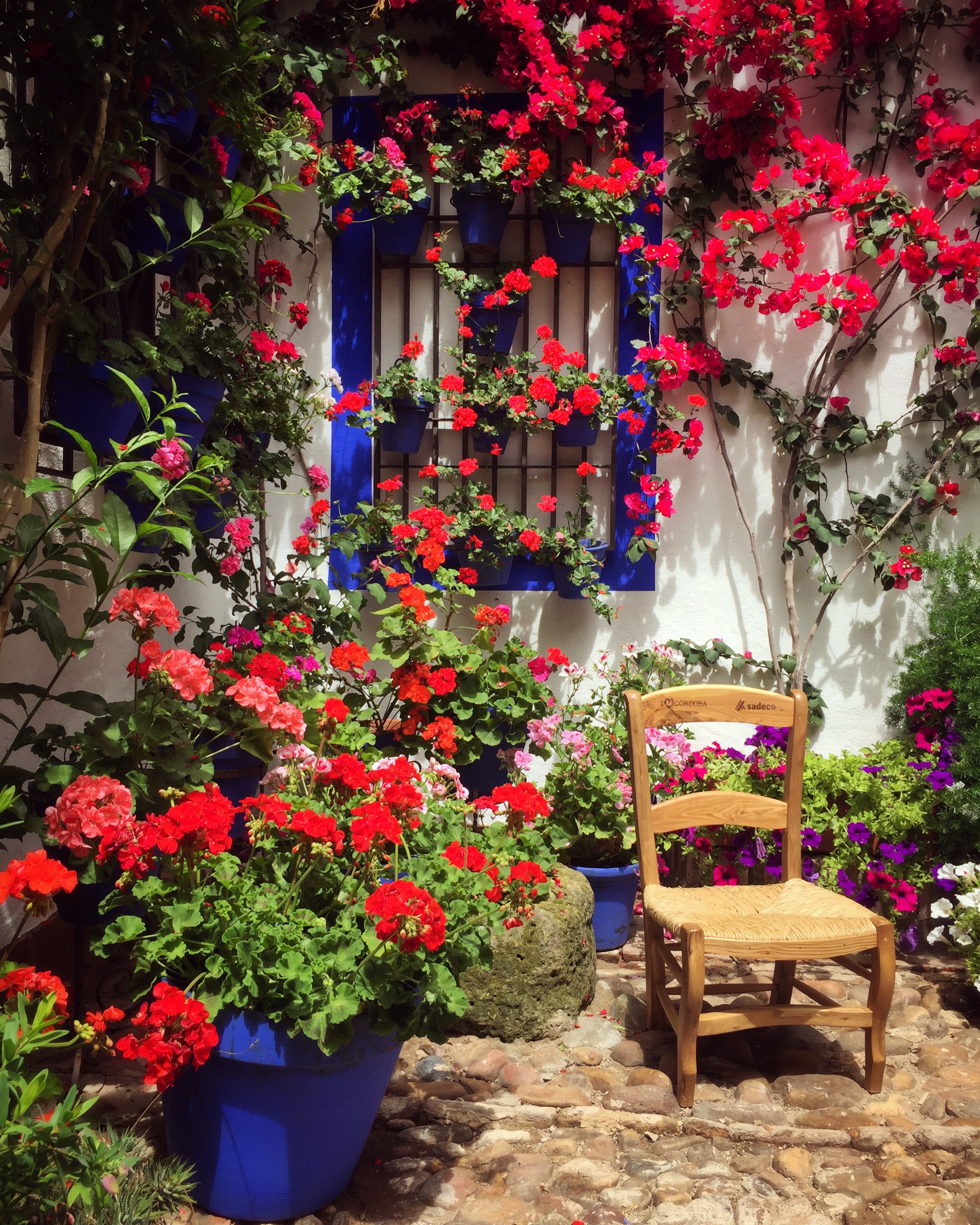
- Courtyards Festival of Córdoba in 2017
- Date: 1st–2nd week of May
- Frequency: Annual
- Locations: Córdoba, Spain
- Inaugurated: 1921

Fiesta of the patios in Cordova
- UNESCO Intangible Cultural Heritage
- Country: Spain
- Reference: 00846
- Region: Europe and North America

Inscription history
- Inscription: 2012 (7th session)
- List: Representative

The Courtyards Festival of Córdoba (also known as Patios Festival of Córdoba and Fiesta of the patios in Cordova) is a courtyard competition in Córdoba, Spain held since 1921 and generally held during the first and second week of the month of May. Participants decorate and open their courtyards for free so that they can be visited during festival hours. In 1980 they were declared a Fiestas of National Tourist Interest of Spain, and after a long process, they managed to be add to the Representative List of the Intangible Cultural Heritage of Humanity by UNESCO on December 6, 2012.

The courtyards during the Festival are separated in two types. Monumental and stately courtyards are courtyards inside palaces of the local aristocracy or notable religious buildings. Competition courtyards are those participated in the competition. The competition courtyards are categorized as courtyards with old architecture (pre 70's buildings) and courtyards with modern or renovated architecture. The Festival continued to receive higher number of visitors. In 2018, there were 150,000 visitors during the Festival.

== Competition history ==
The first Festival was organized by the mayor Francisco Fernández de Mesa in 1921 as a "Courtyards, Balconies and Window Displays Competition." Three prizes of 100, 75 and 50 pesetas were established that were distributed among the only three participants: 8 Empedrada, in the Santa Marina neighborhood, 7 Buen Pastor and 11 Almanzor, both in the Jewish Quarter of Córdoba. Due to the poor response from the neighborhood, the contest was not held again until 1933, during the mayor Francisco de la Cruz Ceballos. That year, the courtyard contest was reborn and began to become popular, with 16 courtyards presented throughout the city, with large prizes for the time.

During the Spanish Civil War (1936-39) the competition was cancelled. The competition was returned again in 1944 under the direction of Antonio Luna Fernández. There was an establishment of evaluation criteria to incorporate additional elements such as architecture, decoration and regional character.

In 1962, the Festival evolved significantly, increasing the amount of the first prize from 3,000 to 8,000 pesetas. In addition, aid is granted to courtyards that have not won any prize to compensate for the effort and expense. With the aim of promoting the contest, classical music concerts and beauty pageants were held. In 1980 they were declared a Fiestas of National Tourist Interest of Spain and in 1988 more criteria such as floral variety, care of pots and flower beds and natural lighting were added. A decade later, the awards were divided into two categories: ancient architecture (from the 16th century to 1960) and modern architecture (from 1960 to the present).

On December 6, 2012, the Festival was declared Intangible Cultural Heritage of Humanity by UNESCO in a session held in Paris.

== Courtyard houses of Córdoba ==
Early history of courtyard houses dated back to the Roman period. During that time, courtyards were used to provide ventilation to the rooms inside the house. In Greco-Roman era, courtyards were open space surrounded by a colonnade, which was a continuous columns to form a peristyle. Other functions for the courtyards in that era were for daily activities and guest reception.

Córdoba was captured by the Muslims in 711 or 712. It was the beginning of an evolution of the courtyard houses in Córdoba by the Arabs. The exterior facades of the houses were kept as blank wall and the embellishment was moved to the interior courtyards.

== Caretakers monuments ==
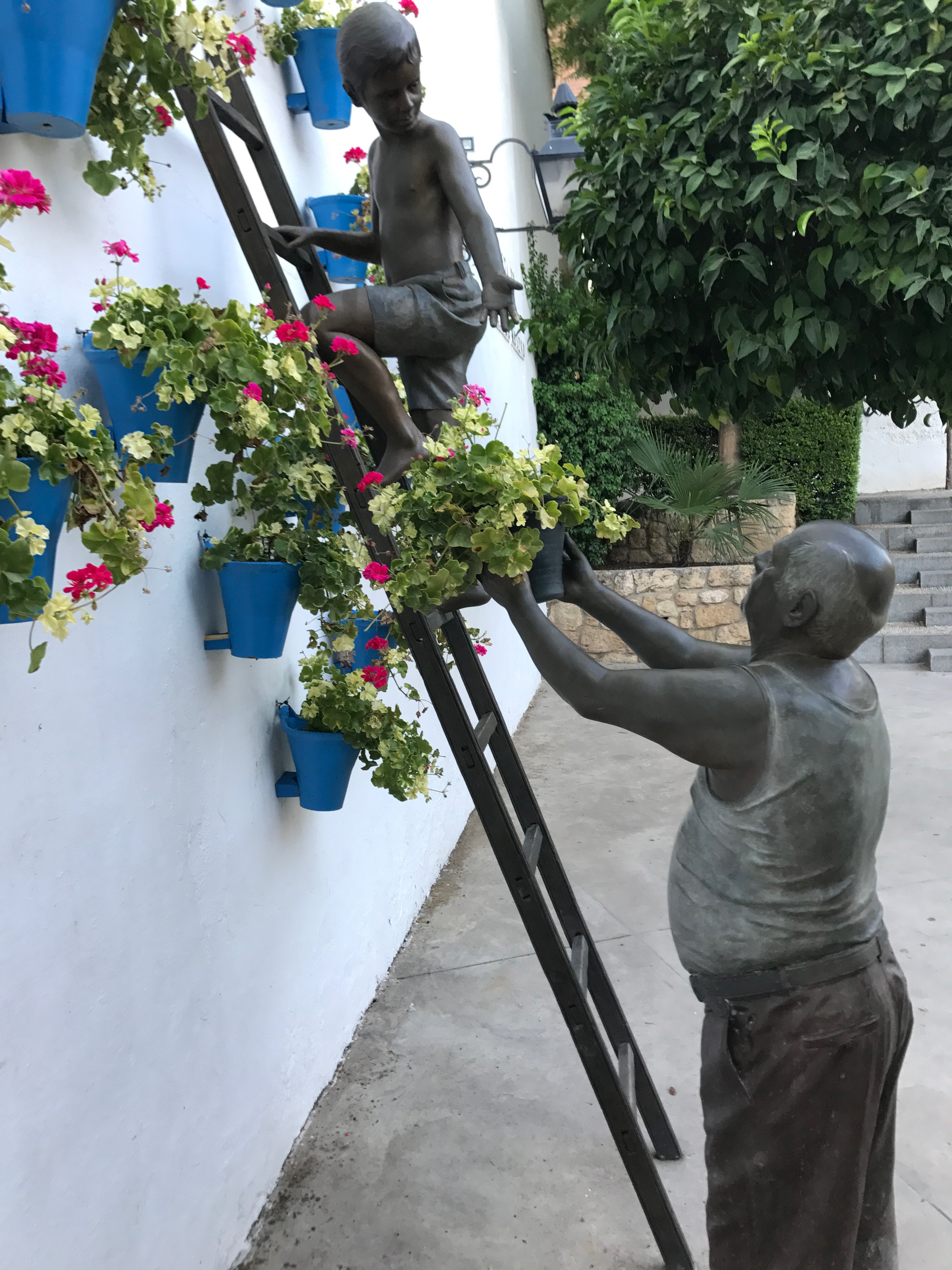
The Grandfather and the Child monument

The Regadora (La Regadora): In April 2014, a couple of years after the declaration of World Heritage Site by UNESCO, a monument dedicated to caretakers was inaugurated at the Puerta del Rincón, made by José Manuel Belmonte, which represents a Cordoban woman watering some royal pots in the traditional style with the cane and the can. The cost of the constructions was 30,000 euros which were financed by Cervezas Alhambra.

The Grandfather and the Child (Abuelo y Niño): In May 2015, the sculpture of the grandfather and the child was inaugurated, which represents the generational passage of the courtyard tradition, as he is handing a flower pot to the grandson who stands on a ladder. It is located at Martín de Roa street in the San Basilio neighborhood.

The Well of Flowers (El Pozo de las Flores): Belmonte's last sculpture was installed on July 6, 2022, in the plaza of the poet Juan Bernier. It is the sculpture of the girl watching her grandmother who sits with a flower pot on her lap on how to take care of the courtyard.

== See also ==
- Andalusian patio
