= José Luis Picardo =

Spanish architect (1919–2010)

- Born: José Luis Picardo Castellón; 18 June 1919; Jerez de la Frontera (Cádiz), Spain
- Died: 27 July 2010 (aged 91); Madrid, Spain
- Education: Escuela Técnica Superior de Arquitectura de Madrid
- Occupation: Architect
- Years active: 1950–1995
- Spouse: Trinidad de Ribera Talavera
- Children: 5
- Awards: Académico de Número de la Real Academia de Bellas Artes de San Fernando (1997); Premio Antonio Camuñas de Arquitectura (2001)
- Buildings: Paradores de Guadalupe, Jaén, Carmona and Sigüenza; Fundación Juan March, Madrid; Sala de Equitación, Real Escuela Andaluza del Arte Equestre, Jerez de la Frontera

José Luis Picardo Castellón (18 June 1919 – 27 July 2010) was a Spanish architect, muralist, draughtsman and illustrator, usually known professionally without his matronymic as José Luis Picardo. As an architect he worked in contrasting architectural languages throughout his career, from the acclaimed modernist headquarters of the Fundación Juan March (Juan March Foundation) in Madrid to the neo-Renaissance style School of Equestrian Art in Jerez de la Frontera, by way of the many medieval-inspired hotel projects he carried out for the Paradores de Turismo de España. While still a student of architecture he made a name for himself as a muralist, embellishing many significant modern interiors in Spain. His drawing skills and his abilities in perspective brought him to the attention of a number of leading architects after the Spanish Civil War, and for some years he provided illustrations, cartoons and covers for two of the foremost Spanish architectural magazines. He also designed interiors, furniture and light fittings for many of his architectural projects. In later life he was elected an Academician of the Real Academia de Bellas Artes de San Fernando and was awarded the Antonio Camuñas Prize for Architecture.

== Early life ==
Picardo was born in Jerez de la Frontera, in the Province of Cádiz in Andalucía, Spain on 18 June 1919. His father was Alvaro Picardo de Celis and his mother's family name was Castellón. He had four brothers, one of whom died in infancy. His father died in 1929 when Picardo was ten years old. With his mother and his brothers he moved to Madrid, Spain. He enrolled at the newly created Instituto de Bachillerato Cervantes for his high school education. On completing school he initially wanted to join the navy, but was frustrated by the closure of the military academies in Madrid during the Second Spanish Republic. He turned to the study of law, but was frustrated again, this time by the start of the Spanish Civil War in July 1936 when he was in the middle of his course. He had just celebrated his seventeenth birthday.

=== Training in architecture ===
To avoid being evacuated from Madrid when the Spanish Civil War began, Picardo joined the studio of the architect Luis Moya Blanco, a professor 15 years his senior at the Escuela Técnica Superior de Arquitectura de Madrid (Higher Technical School of Architecture of Madrid). Impressed by Picardo's abilities, Moya Blanco encouraged Picardo to abandon law and take up a career in architecture.

The Civil War and the dictatorial regime that followed it resulted in fewer architects in Spain. Some of those who had prospered during the Republic did not survive the war. Others had gone into exile or had been professionally disqualified. Under decree by the dictator Francisco Franco the Dirección General de Aquitectura (General Directorate of Architecture) was set up to control architecture in Spain and collaborate in what his regime called la reconstrucción nacional (national reconstruction). Many architects were required to be subordinate to it. Against this background, in 1945 Picardo entered the Escuela Técnica Superior de Arquitectura de Madrid.

From the beginning of Picardo's studies, his abilities in painting and drawing — in particular his mastery of perspective — drew him to the attention of a number of architects who praised him highly. While he was still a student, architects commissioned murals from him for the interiors of their buildings, and employed him within their practices for the graphic representations and perspectives of their plans. Picardo executed his first professional mural painting at the age of 20 in 1939 in the Teatro Fígaro (Figaro Theatre) in Madrid, commissioned by his architecture mentor Luis Moya Blanco. The painting of murals was the main source of income for Picardo during his youth and early career.

As a student Picardo also began to illustrate many articles and later several covers for the Spanish architectural magazines Revista Nacional de Arquitectura and the Boletín de la Dirección General de Arquitectura. His drawings in these publications have been described as showing "increasing sophistication" and being of "complexity and extraordinary quality". Particularly noted in his post-student days were illustrations portraying Madrid in the 1950s and 1960s, the Spanish protectorate in Morocco, and sketches of the Canarias (Canary Islands) in 1953. He also showed a growing interest in historic architecture, in particular its preservation and restoration. Picardo completed his training by making increasingly numerous travels to study buildings around Spain and abroad. His investigative journeys around the Iberian Peninsula awakened in him an intense interest in its historical and vernacular architecture. He was described as an "outstanding" student.

== Early career ==
=== Architect ===
On qualifying in 1951, Picardo pursued his interest in historical architecture by collaborating on a number of building preservation and restoration projects with the Spanish architect and architectural historian Fernando Chueca Goitia, who was 8 years his senior. Chueca's appeal to Picardo was the older man's lengthy research into what he saw as the unchanging elements of Spanish architecture that maintained their constancy despite political and religious changes. Picardo was one of the 24 signatories of the ''Manifiesto de la Alhambra'' of 1952, described as one of “the most remarkable texts in the histiography of 20th-century Spanish architecture", of which Chueca was the main instigator. The manifesto collected the reflections of a group of architects (Picardo among them) and "sought inspiration in the design" of the Alhambra in Granada, Andalucía for "a distinctively Spanish form of modern architecture". This inspiration was to guide much of Picardo's work throughout his career. Its influence, particularly in his work on Paradores, can be clearly seen.

During the 1950s Picardo pursued his personal architectural ambitions, entering competitions and publishing plans and drawings of uncommissioned buildings. In 1951 in company with his fellow architect Carlos de Miguel he designed a centre for the Cofradía de Pescadores (Fishermen's Brotherhood) of Altea in the province of Alicante which attracted much attention but remained unbuilt.

Picardo, working alone, designed a small hotel which could be built on the Costa del Sol in Andalucía. He described it as "un modesto parador (a modest inn), resolved in a simple and attractive way".

In competition, Picardo entered plans and drawings of a preliminary draft for the Delegación de Hacienda de Gerona (Treasury Delegation in Gerona) but came second behind the Spanish architect Carlos Sobrini who had been a year behind Picardo at college. He also came second in a similar competition a year later with a design for the Delegación de Hacienda en Las Palmas (Treasury Delegation in Las Palmas), once again losing to Carlos Sobrini.

In 1958 Picardo co-designed with his brother Carlos Picardo a six-storey edificio de viviendas (apartment building) near Madrid's Plaza de Las Ventas, designed for middle-class families.

In the early 1960s Picardo built some houses in the vernacular and historical Andalucían style on the Costa del Sol and in Jerez and, in contrast, a number of modernist apartment blocks for the construction company Urbis in Madrid. He also moved on to a series of building commissions for the Spanish Ministerio de Información y Turismo (Ministry of Information and Tourism) which laid the foundation for his notable work in the 1960s and 1970s on a large number of the state-owned luxury hotel network Paradores de Turismo de España.

Even early in his architectural career, Picardo was viewed as a supreme draughtsman, producing quick sketches, perspectives, views, details and innumerable plans of his projects in which his skills can be easily identified.

=== Artist ===
As well as his work on modern buildings and on preservation and restoration projects through the 1950s, Picardo continued to receive commissions for decorative mural paintings, where he "demonstrated his mastery in the use of colour and techniques such as watercolour and oil". His works were seen in locations such as the new Hotel de Los Cisnes in Jerez, while in Madrid he embellished the Bar Jerez, the Hotel Plaza, the Residencia de Ingenieros del Instituto Nacional de Colonización (Engineers' residence of the National Institute of Colonization), the Exposición de Regiones Devastadas (Exposition of Devastated Regions), the Instituto de Óptica "Daza de Valdés" (Institute of Optics), the sales area of the Garaje Villamagna (Villamagna Garage) and in 1953 he completed extensive paintings at the Restaurante Commodore in Madrid where amongst other images he produced two large curved panoramic views, one of Madrid and one of Cádiz. Picardo was regarded as an "outstanding" muralist.

At the same time his drawings of buildings and architectural details were published as illustrations in a best-selling textbook on monumental and historic Spanish architecture, Arquitectura Popular Española, by the restoration and conservation architect Leopoldo Torres Balbás. Picardo travelled around Spain with him, making a multitude of detailed drawings of vernacular architectural elements for Balbás' books.

Picardo's published architectural drawings were highly regarded. They were described as "magnificent" by the leading Spanish restoration architect Luis Menéndez-Pidal y Álvarez.

In 1959 Picardo was given an unusual commission: to design a pack of baraja de naipes (playing cards) for exclusive use as advertising material by the Spanish fashion brand Loewe. With much imagination he personalised the characters he portrayed, for instance rendering the King of Hearts as the Emperor Charlemagne, the King of Clubs as Goliath, the King of Diamonds as Julius Caesar and the King of Spades as Alexander the Great. They were produced in colour by the Spanish firm Naipes Heraclio Fournier and surviving packs are much in demand by collectors. Another games design produced by Picardo at much the same time was a set of wooden chess pieces formed in tall, slender, conical shapes and, with the exception of the pawns, surmounted by intricate and delicate indications of the pieces' types. It is dated to 1960.

Around 1960 Picardo was rewarded by the Dirección General de Arquitectura (DGA) for the many illustrations he had provided for the DGA's Boletín since he was a student with the publication of a small book, Dibujos de José Luis Picardo (Drawings of José Luis Picardo). More than 60 drawings appear in the book, both illustrations and humorous cartoons, and the foreword compares Picardo's work to illustrators such as the Romanian-American Saul Steinberg and in Britain Osbert Lancaster and Hugh Casson. The book is long out of print and virtually unknown in Spain, and not at all elsewhere, but is available second-hand.

== Paradores de Turismo ==
From the early 1960s to 1985 Picardo dedicated much of his professional life to the state-run hotel chain, Paradores de Turismo de España. He had for some time carried out minor work for the Ministerio de Información y Turismo which controlled the hotel network. For the purposes of tourism the Ministry and its forebears had for over 30 years rehabilitated rundown and sometimes ruined historic buildings such as castles and convents and converted them into luxury hotels in a style that went beyond ordinary hotel use. In the early 1960s, as Spanish tourism increased, the Ministry decided to rapidly expand its Parador operation (which would within a decade grow from 40 to 83 establishments) and Picardo, with his previous experience of historical restoration and his abiding interest in historical and vernacular buildings, was seen by the Ministry be a suitable architect to take on much of this type of work.

Picardo began working for Paradores on a series of restorations of old, monumental buildings and sometimes building new establishments adjacent to ruined monuments in a style that faithfully copied their original designs. His hybrid conversions maintained and often embellished the monuments' ancient appearance while at the same time finding inspiration in them for the style of luxurious modern hotel arrangements the authorities required.

Many drawings from Picardo's Paradores projects survive, including large collections that cover his designs from whole hotels to small details, and axonometric before-and-after drawings of the buildings and the landscapes around them, demonstrating his mastery of perspective and his spatial vision.

For nearly twenty years, from the early 1960s to his last work for the Paradores in the 1980s, Picardo carried out eleven major reconstructions of historical buildings and/or erected sympathetic and imitative new constructions abutting them or rising from their ruined foundations. With a number he returned to build additions to his earlier work. He also worked on a number of other Parador projects which for various reasons did not reach fruition. His eleven Parador masterworks encouraged other Spanish architects to work in the same vein, and Portuguese architects, too, in the similar state-run chain of hotels in Portugal, the Pousadas de Portugal. Picardo's work for Paradores de Turismo is highly regarded by other professionals, and also by hotel guests who revel in the historical imagery and romance of his work.

=== Parador de Guadalupe: Zurbarán ===
For his first of many Parador projects Picardo was appointed by the Ministry of Information and Tourism in July 1963 to convert into a Parador two ancient neighbouring buildings in the village of Guadalupe in the province of Cáceres in Extremadura. One building was the Hospital de San Juan Bautista, also known as the Hospital de Hombres, which was built in the mid-14th-century, rebuilt in 1402 and refurbished in the 16th century.

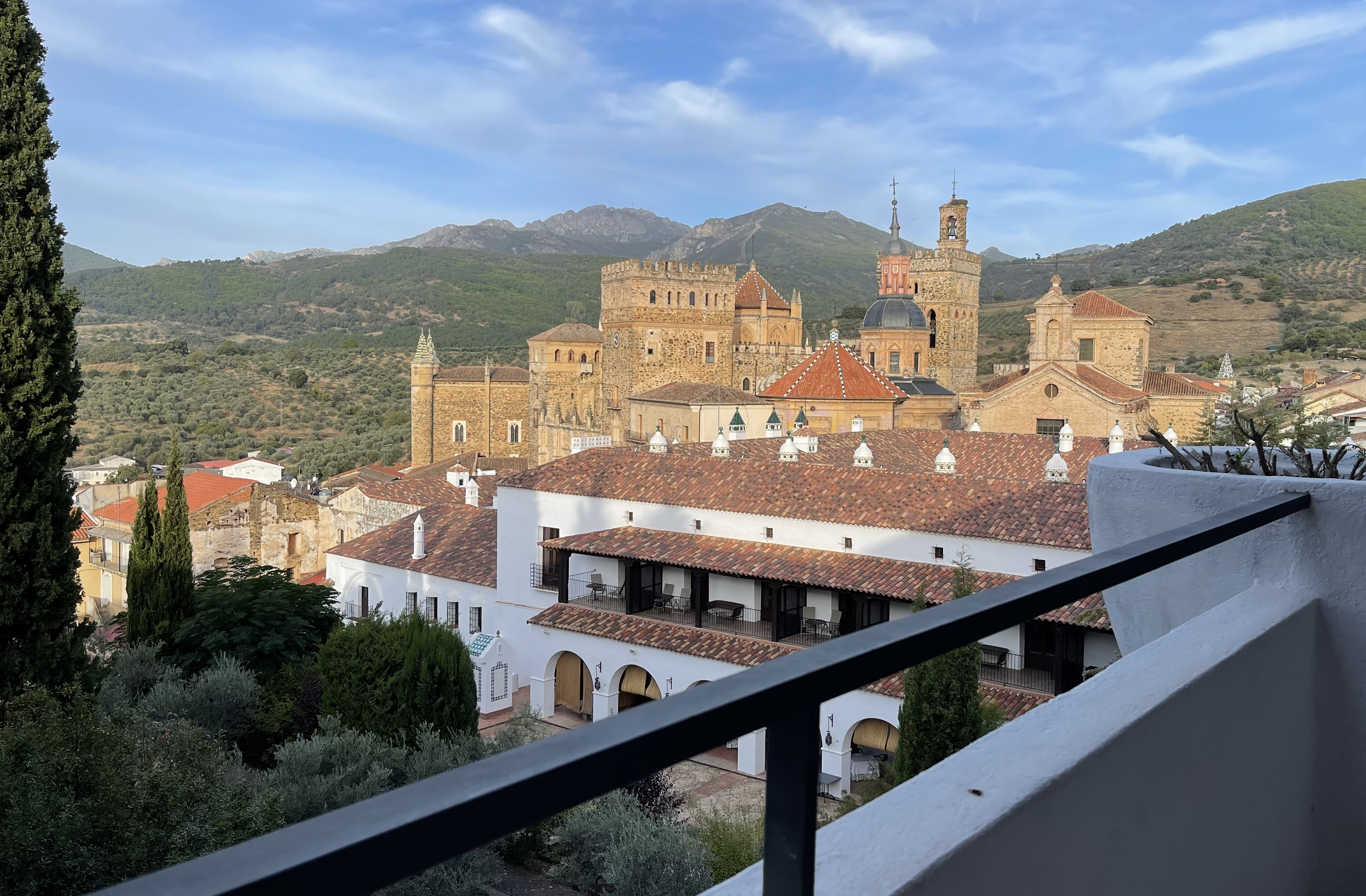
The Parador de Guadalupe with behind it the Monasterio de Santa María, viewed from the 1981 extension, 2022.

The other building was the Colegio de Infantes, also known as the Colegio de Gramática, built in the early 16th-century for the education of boys. They were situated close to the Monastery of Santa María de Guadalupe, one of the most important monasteries of medieval Spain, in the centre of the village. The college was included in the Catálogo de Monumentos Nacionales (Catalogue of National Monuments) when Guadalupe was declared a conjunto monument urban de interés nacional histórico-artistico (monumental urban complex of national historic-artistic interest).

Picardo found the two buildings to be in a ruinous state, housing humble dwellings and poor workshops. While constructing a hotel out of the buildings, his task was to save what remained of their basic structures, including an "outstanding" staircase, and to return them to their original Mudéjar style. He partly demolished the old structures of both buildings, rebuilding them as they had originally looked, using ancient Mudéjar construction techniques based on lime, clay and wood.

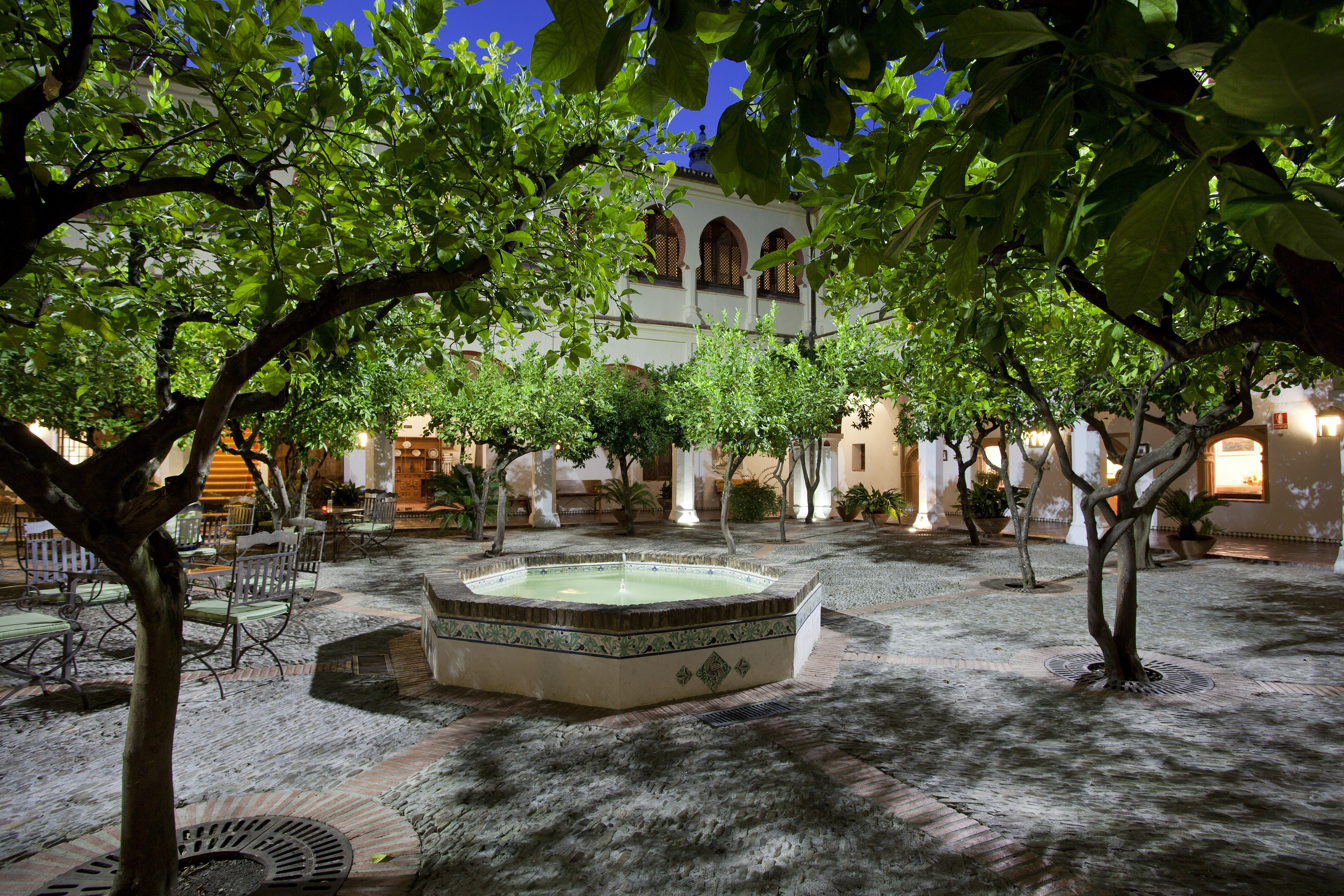
The central cloister at the Parador de Guadalupe, 2014.

Picardo set the main hospitality section of the Parador within the Colegio de Infantes, adding to the external south side of the cloister to provide a dining room and, above it, terraces for guest rooms facing the garden. The cloister remained intact, with Picardo leaving the lower arches open, but closing the upper ones with glass and wooden latticework. The exposed wooden framework and coffered ceilings were respected and clay tile flooring was laid on the upper floor.

The Hospital de San Juan Bautista was remodelled for the hotel's kitchens, service areas, laundry, staff residences, and car parking. Picardo also designed a large first floor breakfast room on the street side of the hospital building.

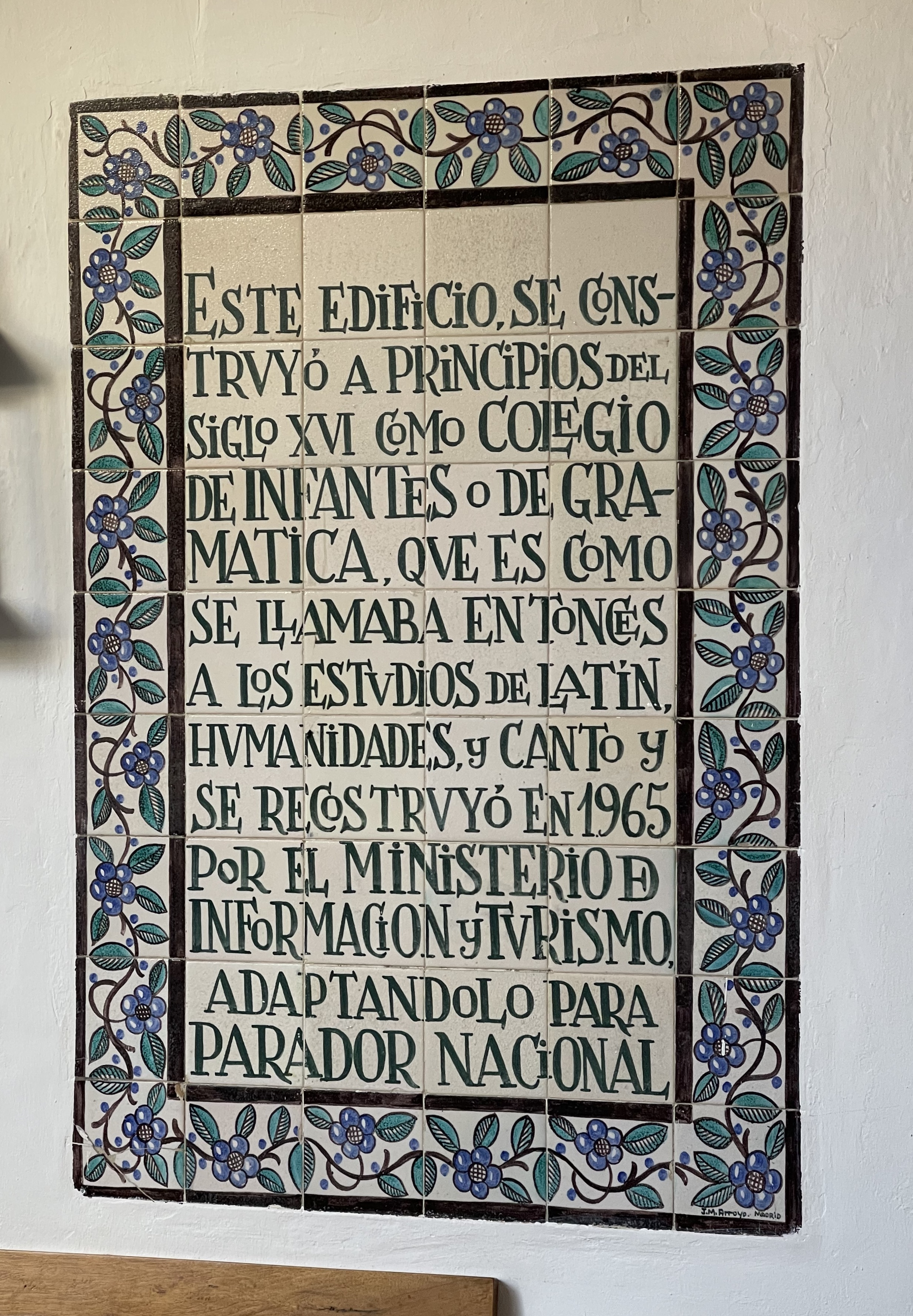
Explanatory tile cartouche at the Parador de Guadalupe, made by the ceramicist Juan Manuel Arroyo.

Ventilation for all the services and rooms throughout the Parador was provided by chimneys which were covered with Arabic tiles and whitewashed uprights perforated with starry latticework and topped with glazed ceramic tiles in white, blue and green.

Most of the furniture and internal decoration was designed by Picardo and he made much use of decorative wall tiles produced by the ceramicist Juan Manuel Arroyo Ruiz de Luna, including some explaining the history of the buildings, signed by Picardo. He was to employ Arroyo repeatedly in his Parador projects over the following twenty years and as a result the ceramicist's work became an identifying feature of Picardo's work.

Restoration at Guadalupe started in November 1963 and the hotel, with twenty double rooms, opened on 11 December 1965.

In 1981 Picardo was invited back to Guadalupe to add a new wing of guest rooms. He built them in understated but similar style to the rest of the Parador, providing views of the rooftops and towers of the monastery and of the surrounding mountains. The new wing increased the number of guest rooms to 41. As a result of being an afterthought to the original design, access to the new wing was complicated and required an abundance of staircases and lifts.

=== Parador de Jaén: Castillo de Santa Catalina ===
At the same time as preparing his restoration at Guadalupe, Picardo was commissioned by the Ministry to design and build a Parador at the Castillo de Santa Catalina (Castle of Santa Catalina) in Jaén in Andalucía.

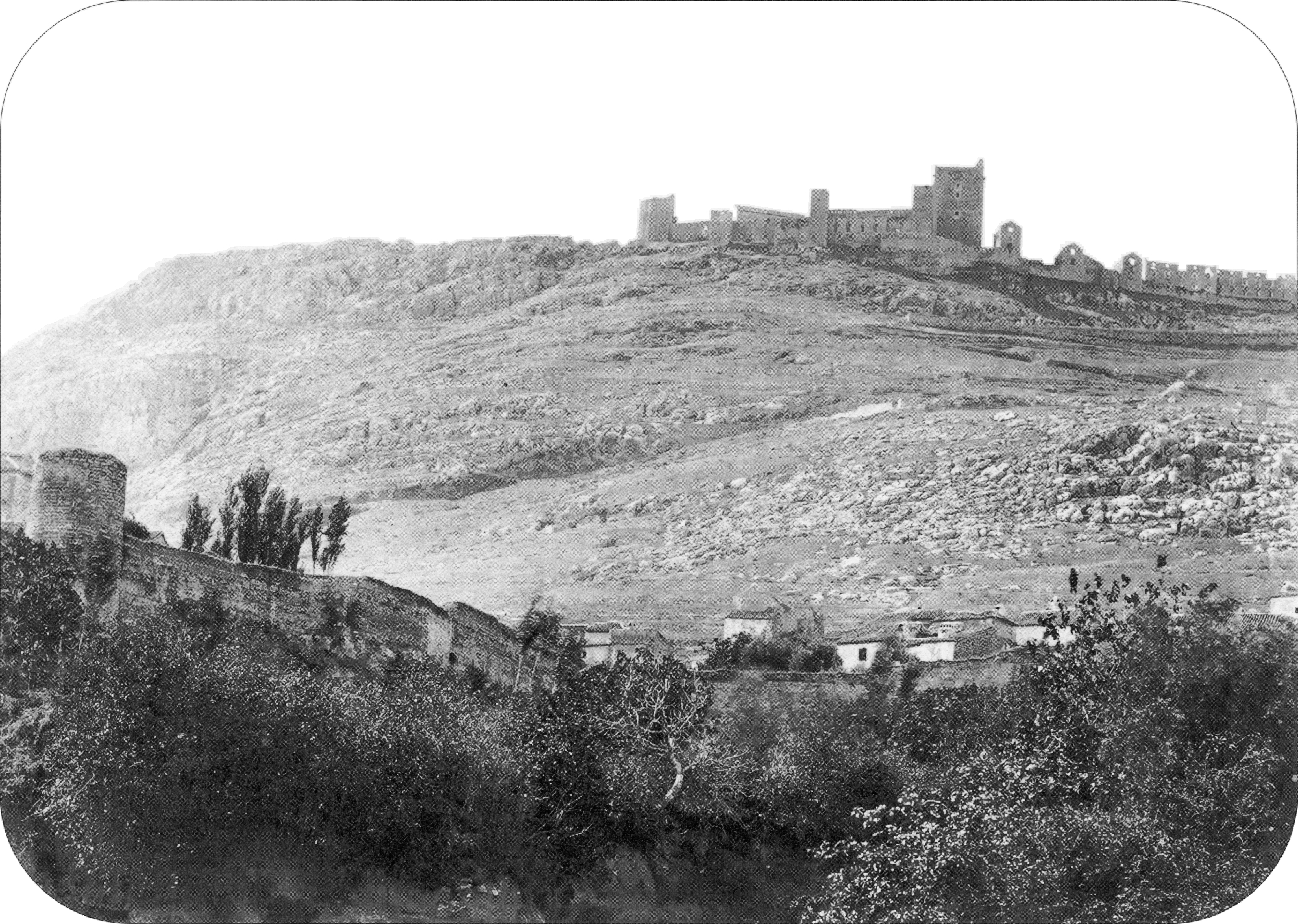
H. Montalvo - Castillo de Jaén in 1862. The ruined buildings on the right were demolished by José Luis Picardo in order to build the Parador de Jaén.

The castle stands on the site of a Moorish fortress and was built in the mid-13th century. It was damaged both in the frontier wars between Moors and Christians and in the Castilian Civil Wars. During the Peninsular War it housed Napoleonic troops. By the time Picardo came to the castle it had been completely abandoned. The site is on the top of a steep hill 800 metres above the city, with views in all directions. Picardo began work on the Parador in early 1963 and his draft plans were ready by the late summer of that year. The building was planned as a simple hostería with the emphasis on refreshment rather than accommodation, and was built on the location of the old barracks and stables of the castle rather than in the castle building itself. Picardo wanted large windows so visitors could enjoy the views; building in the castle would either mean making substantial openings in the original walls or building above the height of the battlements. Neither idea was acceptable to him.

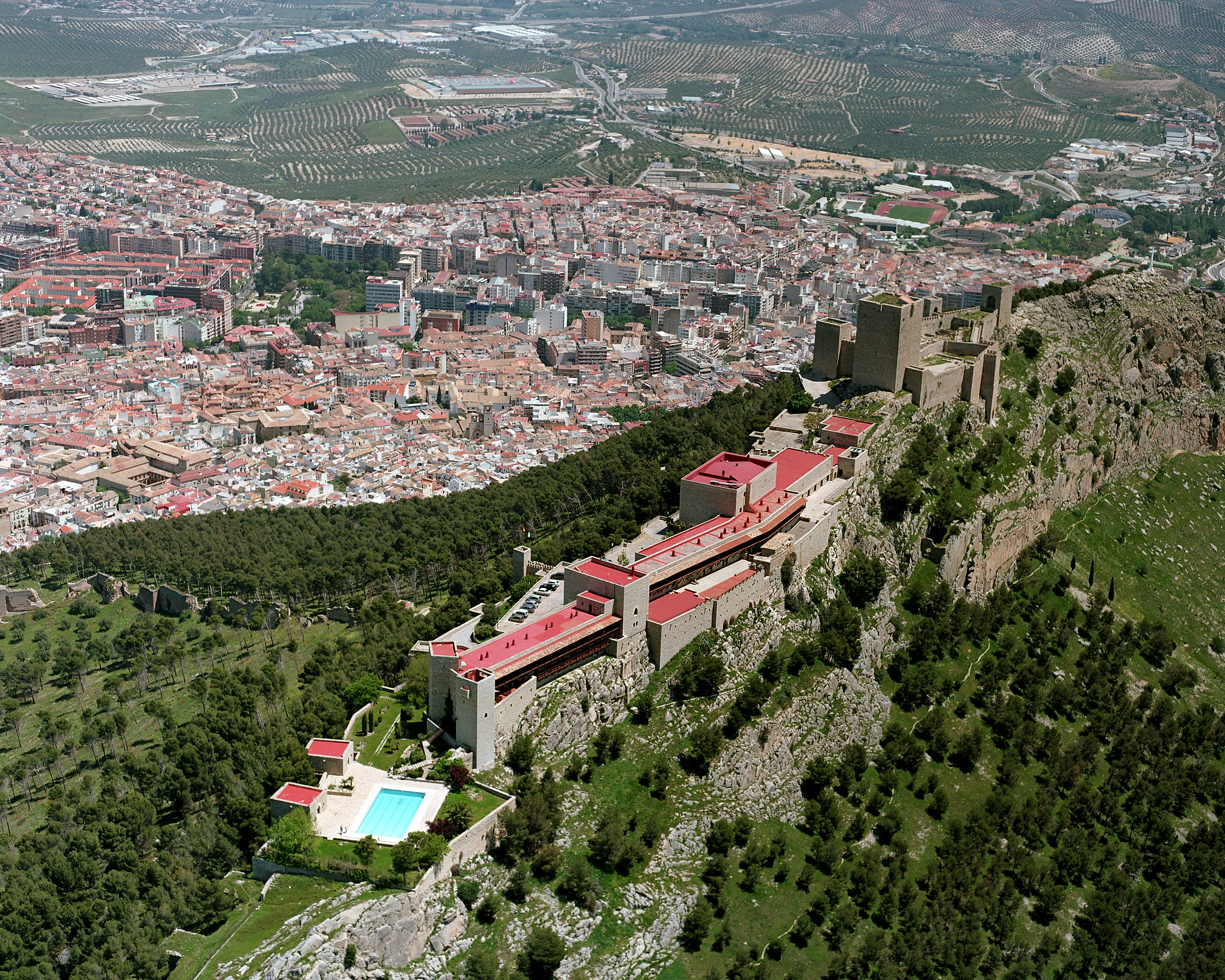
José Luis Picardo's Parador de Jaén (with red roofs) seen high above the city.

Using the elongated site at the top of the hill, Picardo planned a dining room, a lounge, service accommodation and guest rooms. He styled his new building on the layout and dimensions of the old castle and on what had been discovered during his research of its surviving interior designs. Work started in 1963, and the Parador opened to guests on 11 September 1965.

The first phase, built only as a hostería, had on the first floor 7 double guest rooms with fireplaces and with wooden balconies of a design that Picardo would repeat in a number of his later Parador designs. A mezzanine floor housed a cafetería and a bar with an outside terrace, and on the ground floor was the reception area, the lounge and the restaurant, together with the service areas. There were also four single rooms for drivers, and a mechanical workshop.

Picardo's Parador at Jaén was a pastiche, which paid homage to the neighbouring castle. The basic structure was 20th-century concrete, steel, block and cement but he completely hid it from the public gaze with stone, brick, timber and iron in a way that suggested age and implied that the cladding materials formed the entire construction. The 20 metres high vault of the lounge appears to be built entirely of brick, but the structural impression is false; the Parador's admiring guests are not aware of the modern supporting skeleton behind the brick. Also much admired are the six impressively large and lofty stone arches in the dining room, which appear to support the ceiling and roof and achieve "una sensación espacial espectacular" (a spectacular spatial sensation), but are in fact hiding the room's steel frame.

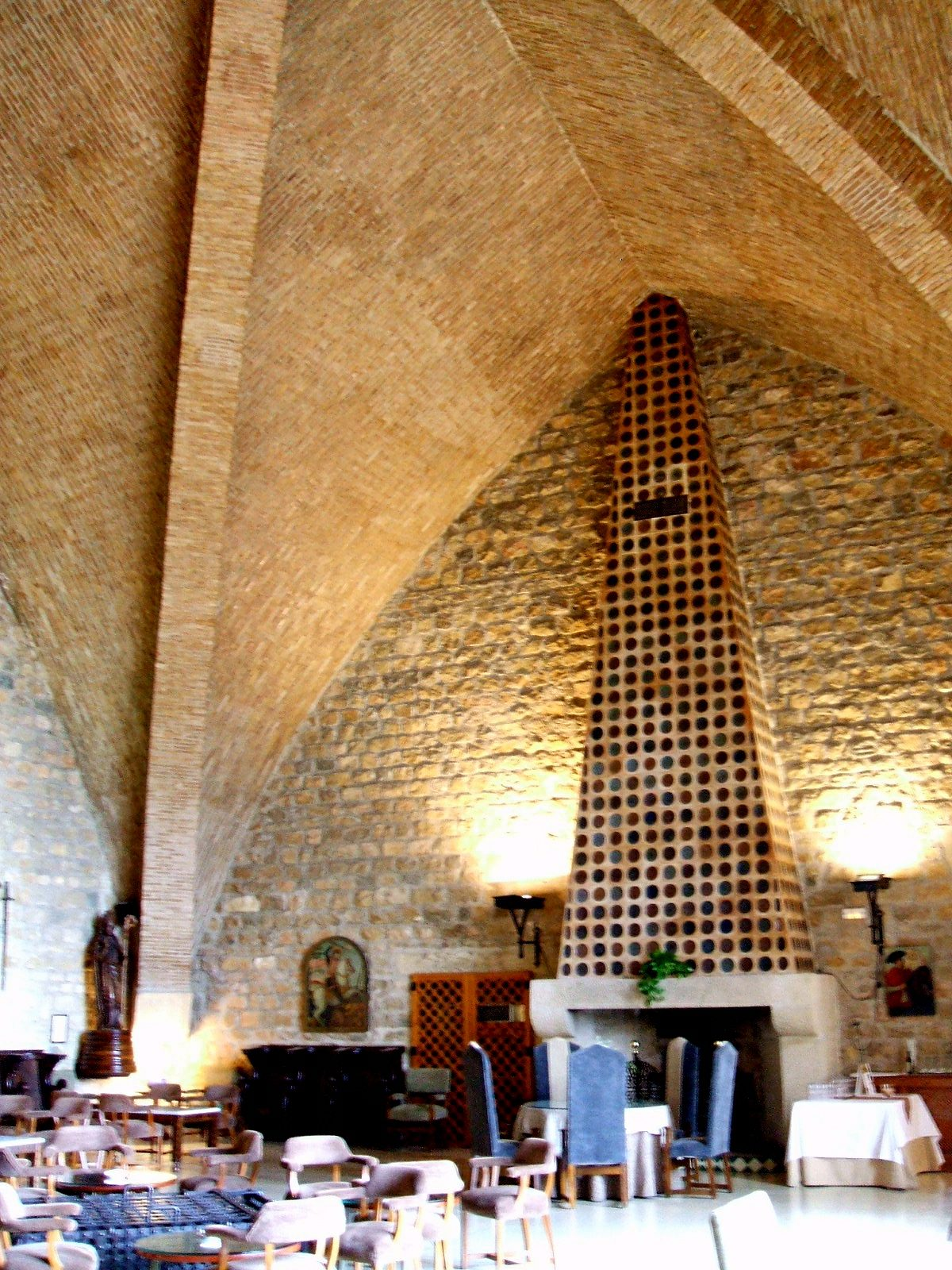
The 20 metres high vault of the lounge of the Parador de Guadalupe.

In a second phase in 1969 Picardo added service rooms on the south wall, allowing the old service area to be converted into a further 12 guest rooms.

In the late 1960s and early 1970s excessive rain caused a number of landslips in the unstable ground around the castle and hostería and Picardo was regularly called in to strengthen the building.

Picardo returned to the project in 1973 to build a further extension in the same style. This was erected to the west of the first building and was joined to it by a tower which allowed for a change of heights between the original building and the new one. 24 guest rooms were added by the new extension, on two floors, bringing the total to 43. Picardo was hampered by the layout of the available land, and by limitations in the height to which he could build, so the extension elongated the building in a way that produced long corridors and distances between bedrooms and public areas. With the opening of Picardo's extension, the building was elevated to the title of Parador. It was inaugurated in 1978.

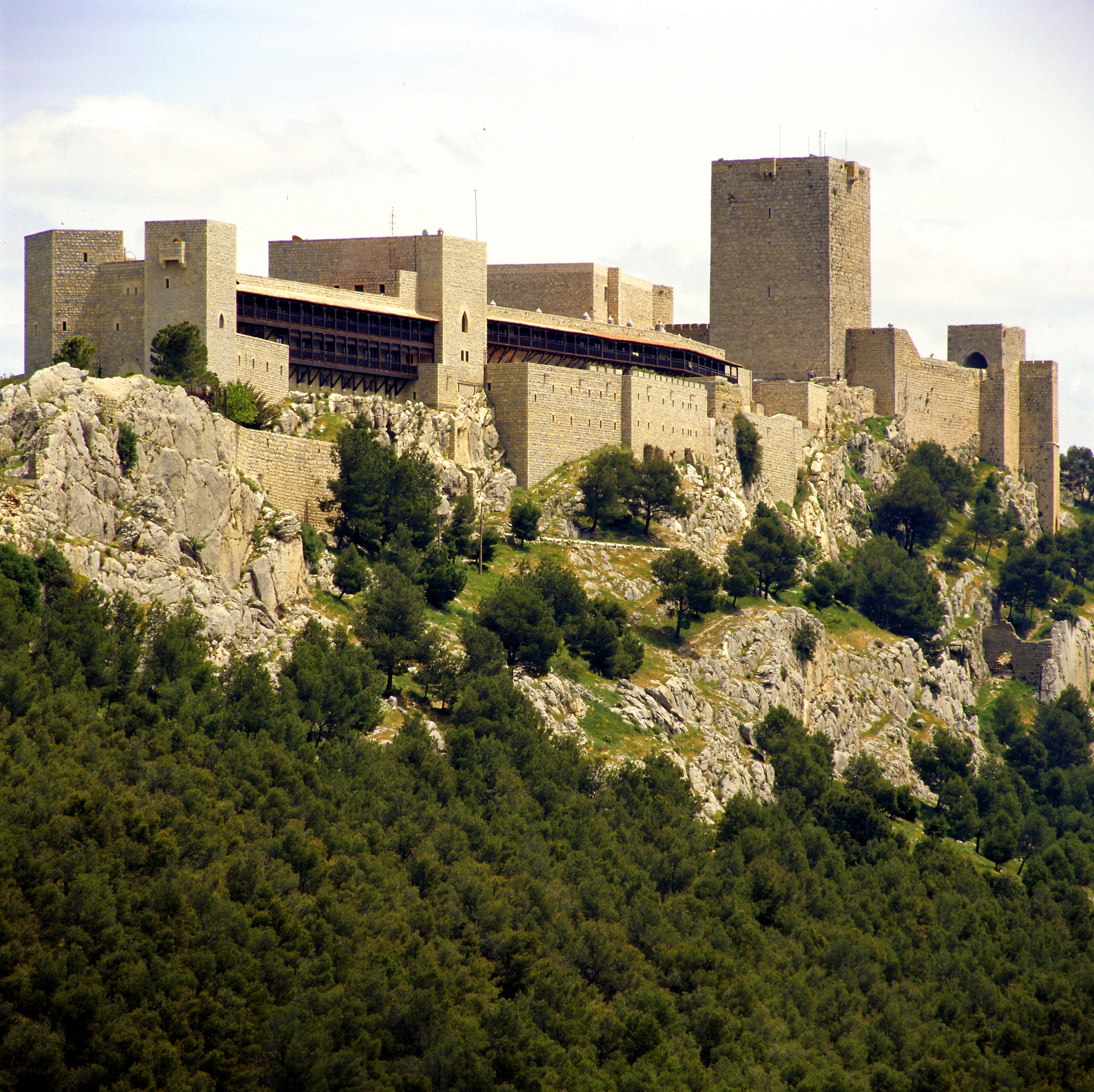
Parador de Jaén in 2014. The original castle is on the right. The first phase of the Parador, opened in 1965, is in the centre. To the left is the extension completed in 1978.

Picardo also designed the building's interior, producing furniture, wall-hangings, shutters, carpets, light fittings, door furniture, floor and wall tile patterns and so on to continue emphasising the building's medieval ambience. He also used coats of arms from demolished buildings for both the interior and exterior of the Parador. He featured hand-painted written ceramic tiles, produced by Juan Manuel Arroyo, to decorate and 'sign' the building, to expound on its history and to credit the surveyor and stoneworker.

In an article about the Jaén Parador for an architectural magazine in 1967, Picardo rhapsodised about the mood and aura he had created for the building: "Exterior, un conjunto de masas elementales rectangulares./Interior, techos con artesas, bóvedas y arcos, madera, barro y piedra. .../Ay del romancero!" (Outside, a gathering of rectangular blocks./Inside, artesonado ceilings, vaults and arches, wood, clay and stone. .../Oh, the romance!)

In the same article Picardo credited his "maestros" (masters): "Torres-Balbás, Moya, Sota y Luis Santamaria. Ninguno de ells la ha vista. Qué dirán?" (None of them has seen it. What will they say?)

At Jaen, and at Guadalupe, finished at much the same time, Picardo established a style of architecture and interior design which found favour with his clients and their guests and which he was to pursue in most of his further work for Paradores, refining it where required and elsewhere repeating it faithfully.

=== Parador de Arcos de la Frontera: Casa del Corregidor ===
The Parador at Arcos de la Frontera in the province of Cádiz in Andalucía is located in the centre of the old town, at the top of the cliffs that overhang the Rio Guadalete. Picardo first visited the triangular site in February 1964. He decided immediately that the façades of the buildings facing the Plaza de España and the castle should be preserved, while the rest of the site — the old municipal slaughterhouse and other public utility premises and houses — should be demolished, though seven 2.35 metre columns from a patio within one of the buildings should be preserved to be used in the new building.

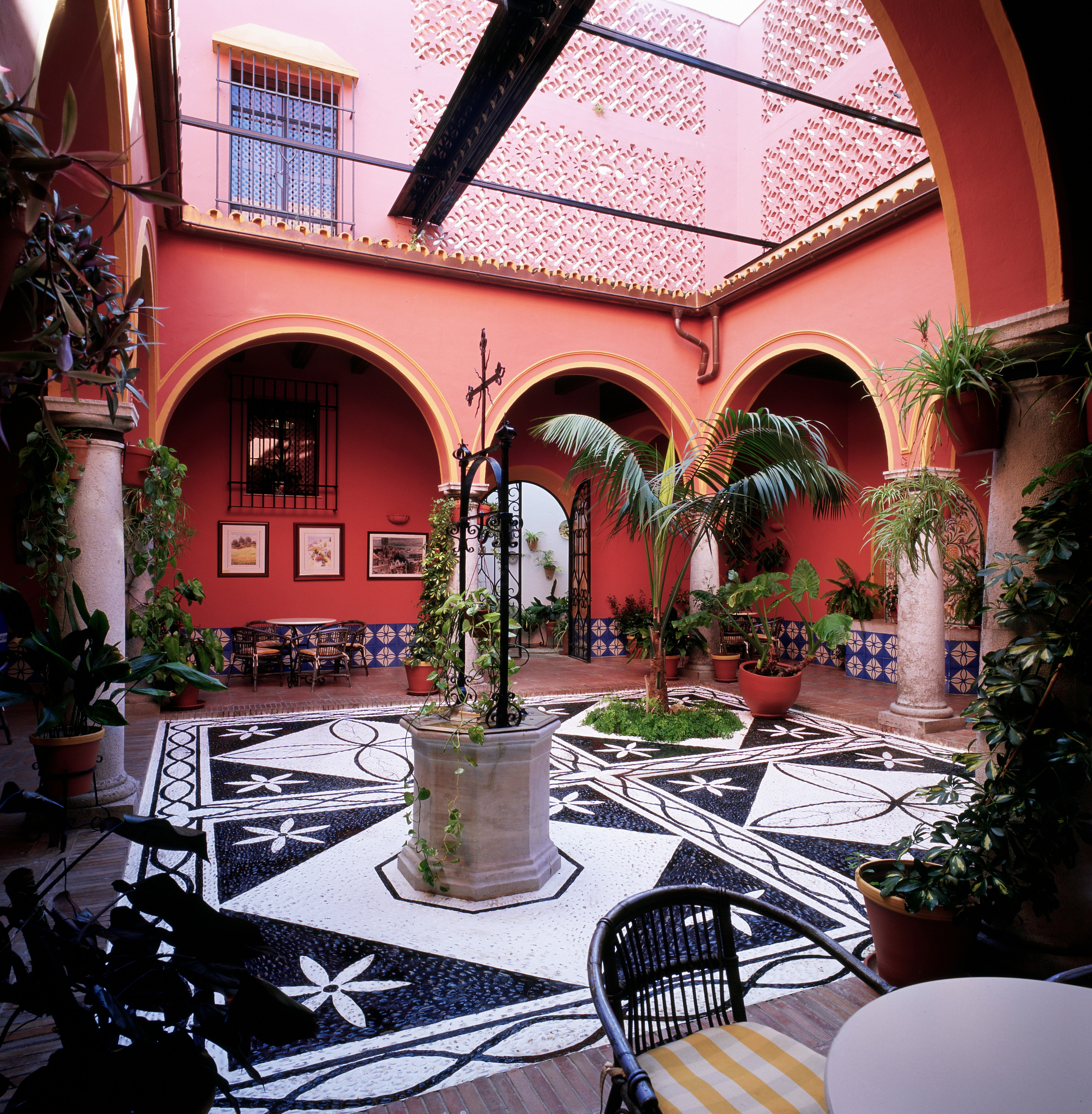
The central patio of the Parador de Arcos de la Frontera. Some of the preserved stone columns can be seen.

In the twelve months from February 1964 all the demolition work was carried out. Picardo started work in October that year. He encountered a problem with a 15 centimetres wide crack across the top of the cliff which had been caused by the 1755 Lisbon earthquake. He surmounted it by constructing a patio rather than building on the fractured zone next to the cliff edge. This single deck was built as an independent structure separated from the main building, so that any future movement of the terrain would not effect the Parador itself.

Picardo's design of the Parador was a copy of a typical Andalucían residence with an entrance hallway leading to a typical patio, open to the sky, with terracing supported by the seven reused columns (though one further column had to be made to copy the others so as to achieve the same number of columns on all four sides).

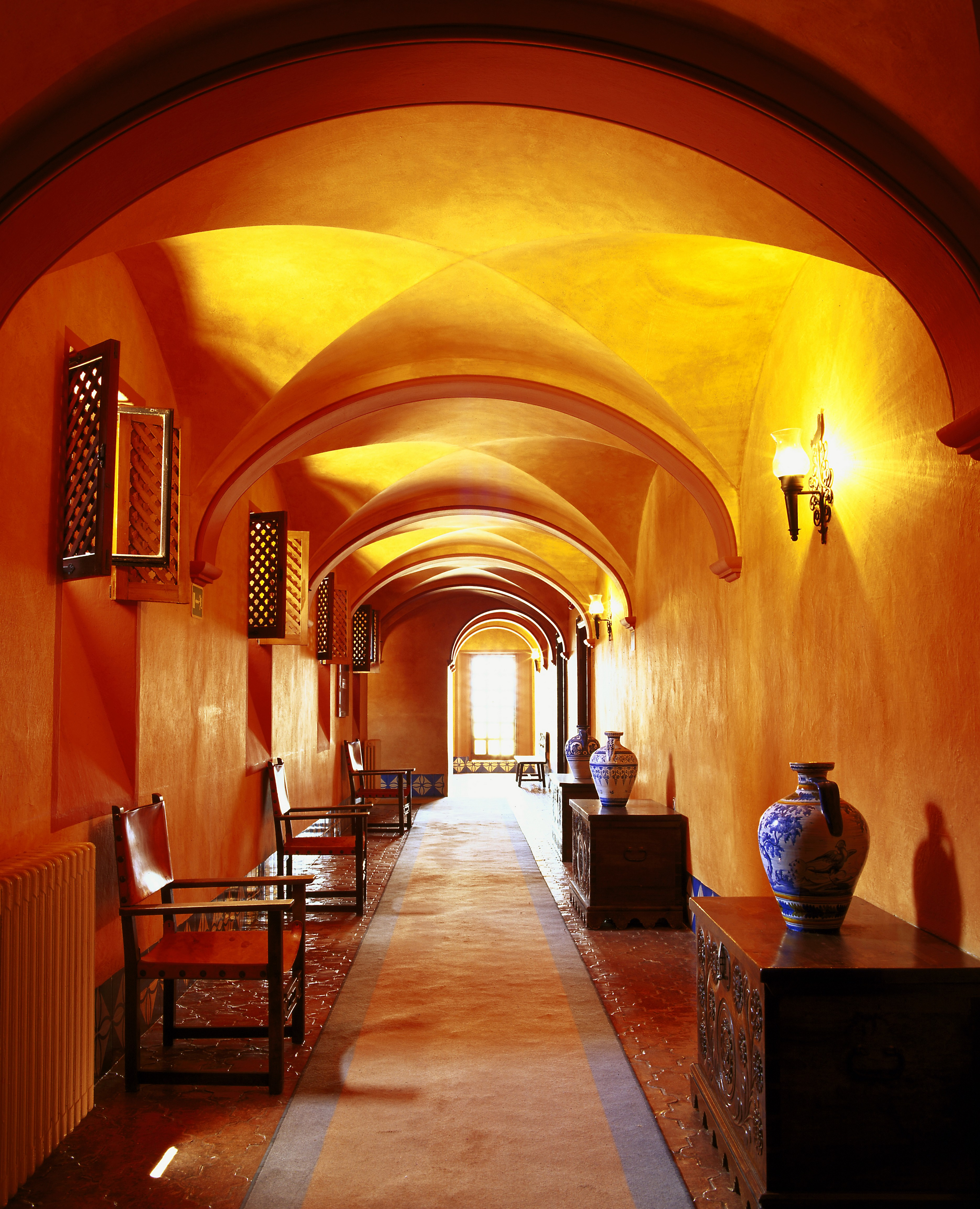
A guest room corridor in the Parador de Arcos de la Frontera.

There were further small secondary patios. The dining room and sitting room were positioned to take advantage of the widespread views to the south and southwest over and beyond the river.

Throughout the building Picardo copied many Andalucían architectural features, most particularly in the ceilings, using exposed pine wood joists, linked by vaulted plasterwork, and the floors which were terracotta throughout. As at Guadalupe and Jáen, Picardo designed much of the interior furniture, fittings, lighting and decoration, copying many of the features, both large and small, he had used in the earlier projects. He also used his typical ceramic tiles throughout the building, both for decoration and for explanatory texts.

Picardo planned 18 guest rooms, but initially only 9 were built, some in the building facing the plaza, and the rest fronting the cliff-edge view. The latter benefitted from the same design of open wooden galleries Picardo had utilised at Jaén. The Parador opened to guests on 7 November 1966.

Picardo returned to Arcos in 1974 to complete his original plan, building another floor on the part of the building overlooking the cliff, using the same design features, and increased the number of guest rooms to 18. The extension entered service in 1979. (Note: The earthquake-induced crack caused severe problems in 1983 following landslides on the cliff face, forcing the Parador to be temporarily closed. Anchors were employed to strengthen the cliff and the Parador reopened.)

=== Hostería de Pedraza: Hostería Pintor Zuloaga ===
In 1965 Picardo was commissioned by Paradores to restore and rehabilitate the old Casa de la Inquisición (House of the Inquisition) in the small, historic village of Pedraza, 37 kilometres northeast of Segovia in Castilla y León. It was to be a hostería - only a restaurant and a bar - without guest rooms.

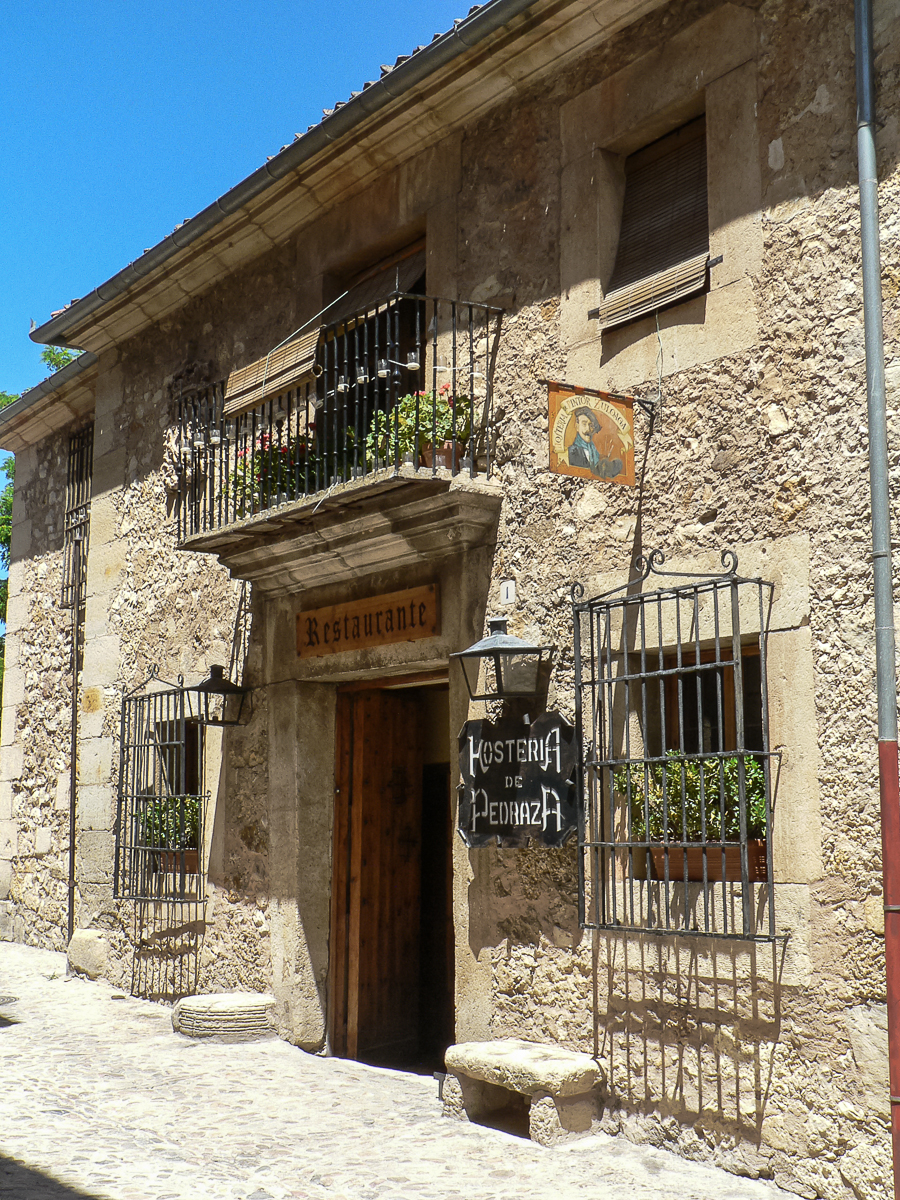
Hostería de Pedraza in 2007

The three-storey property was mostly in ruins when Picardo surveyed it and was consequently not protected by conservation laws. He was therefore free to carry out his renovation as he saw fit, building on the medieval and rural ambience of the village. On the exterior he rearranged and improved the windows, preserved the surviving coat of arms above the front door, and at the rear added what was becoming his signature open wooden gallery on the top floor.

Inside, Picardo followed the rustic style of the region's inns, building a spacious lounge behind the entrance hall, with a large and low fireplace, and on the upper floors the bar and the 90-seat dining-room opening onto the balcony-gallery.

Once again, Picardo designed his own furniture and other fittings, the lighting and decoration, following the local style.

The hostería - named "Pintor Zuloaga" - opened to the public on 14 December 1967.

At the same time Picardo raised the idea of expanding the property by purchasing neighbouring buildings. He had been concerned that the Hostería had restricted views, and felt that an extension could be designed with extensive views of the Sierra de Guadarrama to the south. His plans offered the prospect of 16 guest rooms and in November 1969 the proposal to convert the Hostería into a Parador was made public. However, difficulties in purchasing the neighbouring property made the project impossible.

The Pedraza Hostería continued in operation until 15 December 1992 when economic pressures on the Parador chain caused its closure. (Note: An independent management leasing from the chain allowed the inn to reopen on 4 October 1993, but again it was forced to close on 31 August 2013. It was put up for sale by Paradores in December 2015 and it reopened under new management on 22 November 2019 as a location for events.)

=== Parador de Alcañiz: La Concordia ===
In 1966 Picardo began the conversion into a Parador of the Palacio de los Comendadores at Alcañiz in the province of Teruel in Aragon. The palace - the façade of which was remodelled in late-Renaissance style in 1728 - stood as the most prominent additional part of the Castillo de los Calatravos (Castle of the Calatravos), a monastery-fortress built in 1179. The oldest parts of the structure, a keep, a church and a cloister, date to the 12th and 13th centuries.

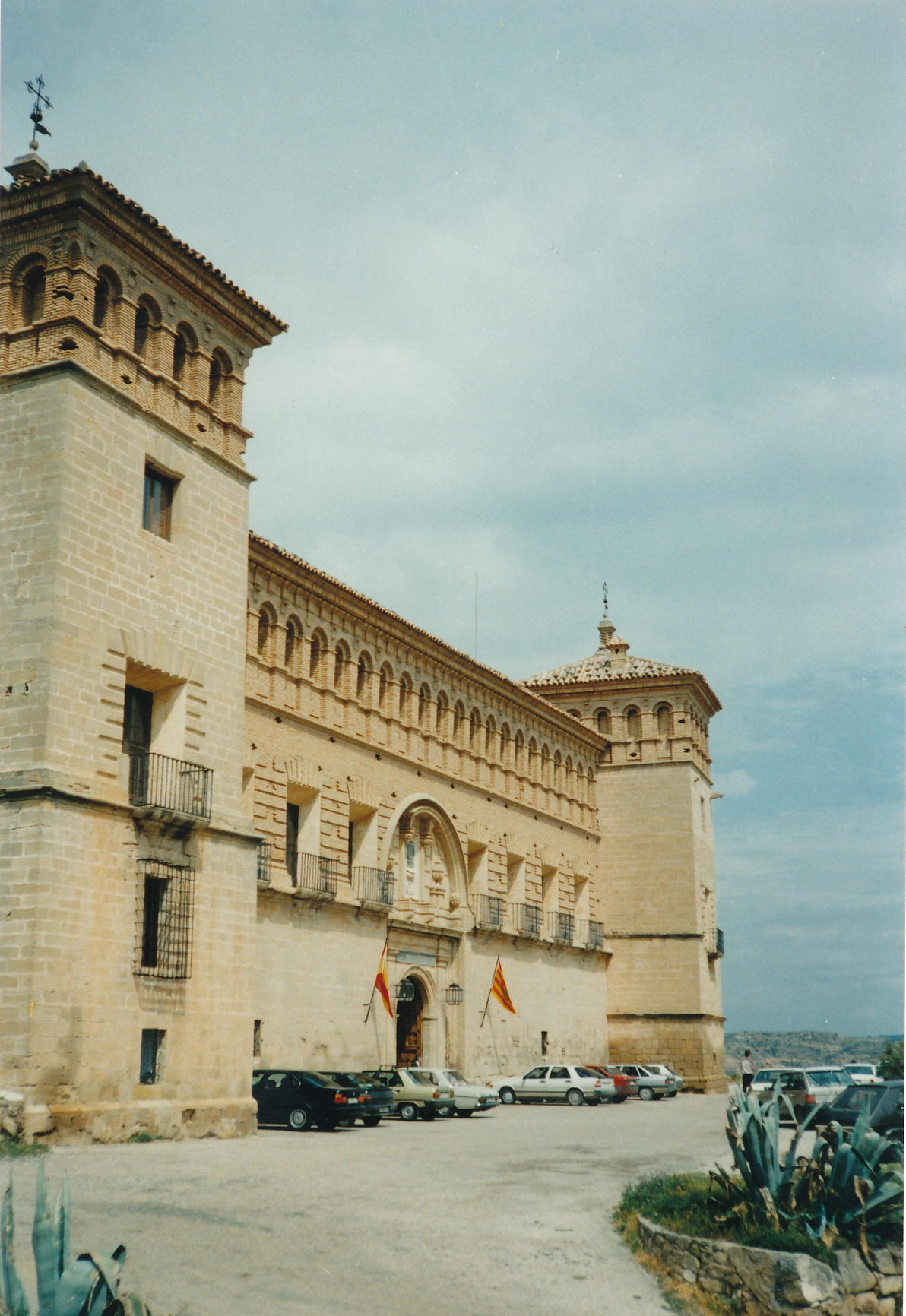
The south wing frontage of the Parador de Alcaniz, photographed in 1989.

The section of the property set aside for Picardo's conversion was the immense south wing, which was flanked by two towers and divided into three floors, the ground floor built of ashlar and the upper two floors of brick. There were balconies on the first floor, and on the uppermost floor a characteristic Aragonese long gallery had been developed, created by a succession of semi-circular arches. The castle had been allowed to fall into disrepair and in some parts into ruin, but in 1925 it was declared a National Monument.

When Picardo began work on the design he found that space in the palace was limited and he was unable to provide more than 12 guest rooms. His plan for the public areas included the conversion of two large and long ground floor interiors, with pointed barrel-vaulted ceilings, on each side of the building's entrance. To the left of the entry, in the original guardhouse, he placed the reception area and to the right, where the old stables were situated, he placed the bar and cafetería, adding one single window to each space to allow in some daylight. In these rooms Picardo left the exposed masonry of the walls and ceilings. The main dining room, which he placed on the first floor, connected by the main staircase from the ground floor, was based on the great hall of a palace. In it he featured a large fireplace and chimney at one end, and used a multitude of large timber beams to shape a coffered ceiling, with decorative plasterwork strung below.

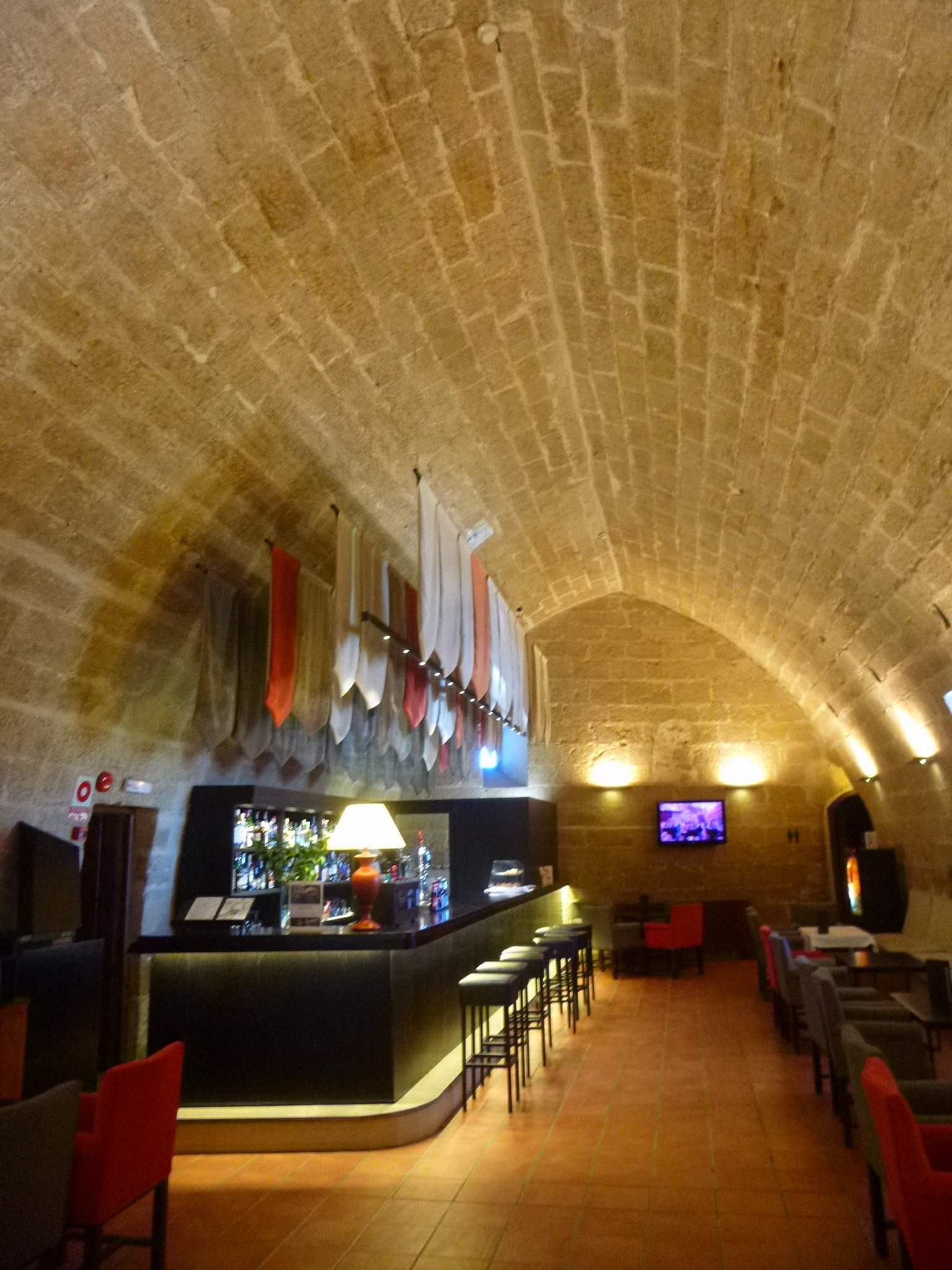
The bar of the Parador de Acaniz with its pointed barrel-vaulted ceiling, 2016.

The twelve guest rooms were arranged on the second floor, but the windows being high in the walls, Picardo arranged for a raised area in front of each window so that guests could see out of the windows with greater ease. The public corridors followed the design pioneered by Picardo at Jaén of imitation stone groin vaults at regular intervals.

In planning the interior decoration Picardo determined that the ground floor would be medieval in design in keeping with the original military use of the palace, and the upper floors would be more palatial in decor. He designed much of the joinery, the beds, the tables, the chairs and, in particular, the light fittings, making use of the emblem of the Order of Calatrava as a decorative motif. His attention to detail even extended to the design of hinges and handles for doors, and for the heads of nails used in the door faces. He also made considerable use of his characteristic ceramic murals decorating the public parts of the building, including his history of the castle, all produced by his favoured ceramicist, Juan Manuel Arroyo, and signed by Picardo.

The Parador opened for service on 18 May 1968 and was inaugurated on 6 July 1968.

As early as 1972 Picardo had reported to the Ministry of Information and Tourism on the feasibility of carrying out further work to increase the number of rooms at Alcañiz. In 1975 he designed a new two-storey wing for the ruined west side of the complex which would double the number of guests rooms. His plans lay in abeyance until 1998 when the architect Carlos Fernández-Cuenca Gómez resurrected Picardo's original 1975 designs. They had to be altered somewhat in the light of archeological discoveries made since 1975, but much of Picardo's ideas were incorporated in the expansion of the Parador, bringing the number of guest rooms to 38.

=== Hostería de Cáceres: El Comendador ===
In 1966 Picardo was commissioned by the Ministry of Information and Tourism to work on the Palacio del Comendador de Alcúescar (Commander's Palace of Alcúescar), also known as the Palacio de los Marqueses de Torre Orgaz, in the historic centre of Cáceres in the province of the same name in Extremadura. Originally built as a medieval fortified residence on pre-existing Arab buildings in 1488, the palace was modified in later centuries, adding Gothic, Renaissance and Baroque elements. The Ministry proposed the conversion of one part of the palace into a Hostería.

The part of the building on which Picardo was to work was a jumble of old buildings, some attached to the main palace building and some free-standing, which had mostly formed stables and coach houses. There was also a patio-garden between these buildings and the palace and its tower.

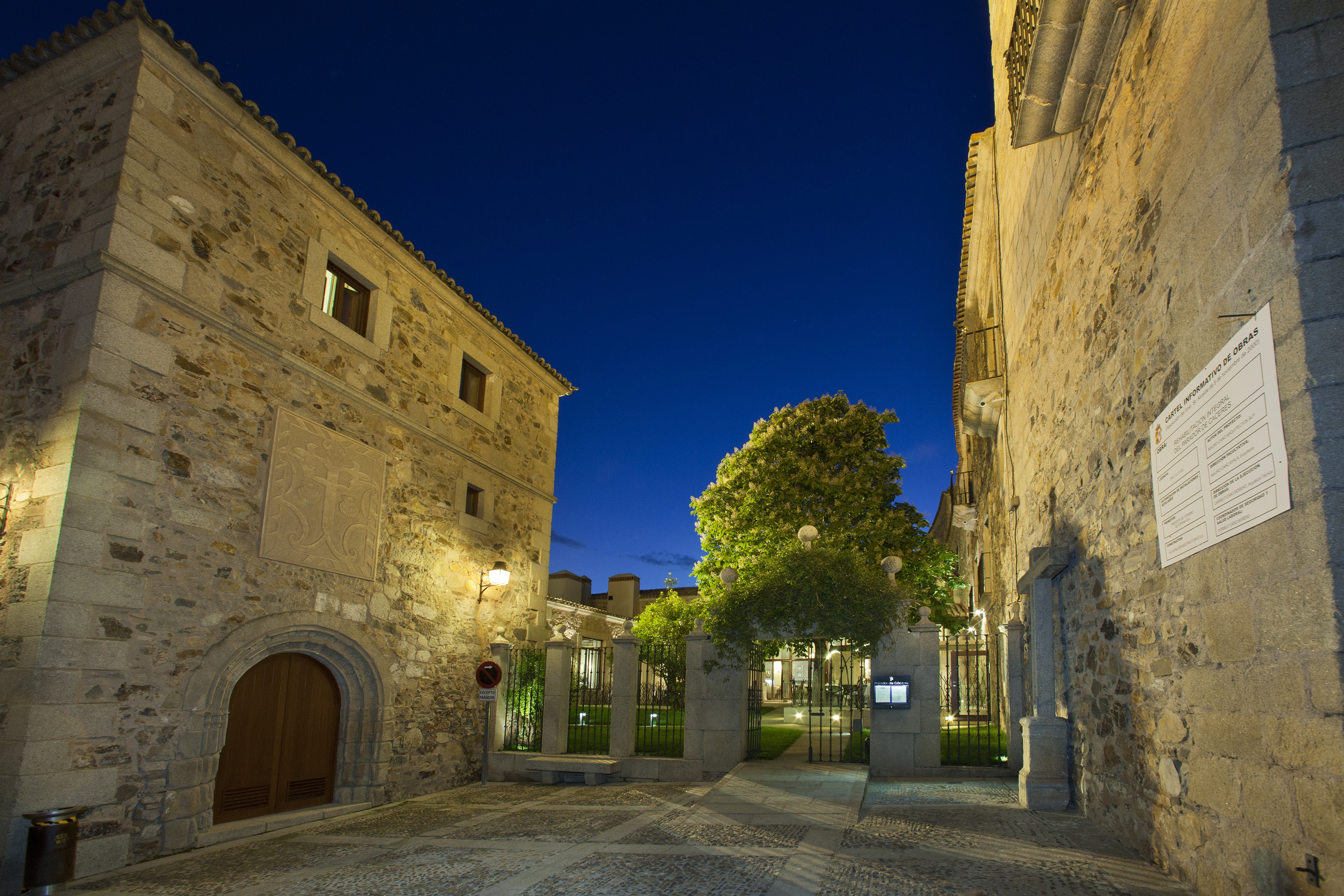
Parador de Cáceres in 2014. José Luis Picardo's original Hostería entrance is on the left and, centre, his gateway to the patio.

Picardo began by demolishing most of the ramshackle service buildings, other than the square structure at Number 6 Calle Ancha which benefitted from substantial stone walls and four brick, groined vaults. Picardo decided the lower ground floor of this building would form the bar and cafetería, with a doorway from the street which would become the main entrance to the Hostería. He erected three further floors above the lower-ground floor, reusing many architectural elements from the demolished buildings. Picardo also installed a sgraffito image above the main doorway, featuring the cross of the Orden de Santiago (Order of Santiago).

A new one-storey building was erected to the rear of the plot, imitating similar buildings in the city. Ashlar and solid brick formed the interior and exterior facings of the walls, and pantiles were utilised on the roofs. Picardo also excavated large areas beneath the buildings to make service areas. He designed and built a stone and iron enclosure and entrance gateway from the street to the patio garden. Throughout, his intention was to make the Hostería appear, through imitation, to be an integral historic part of the old city centre.

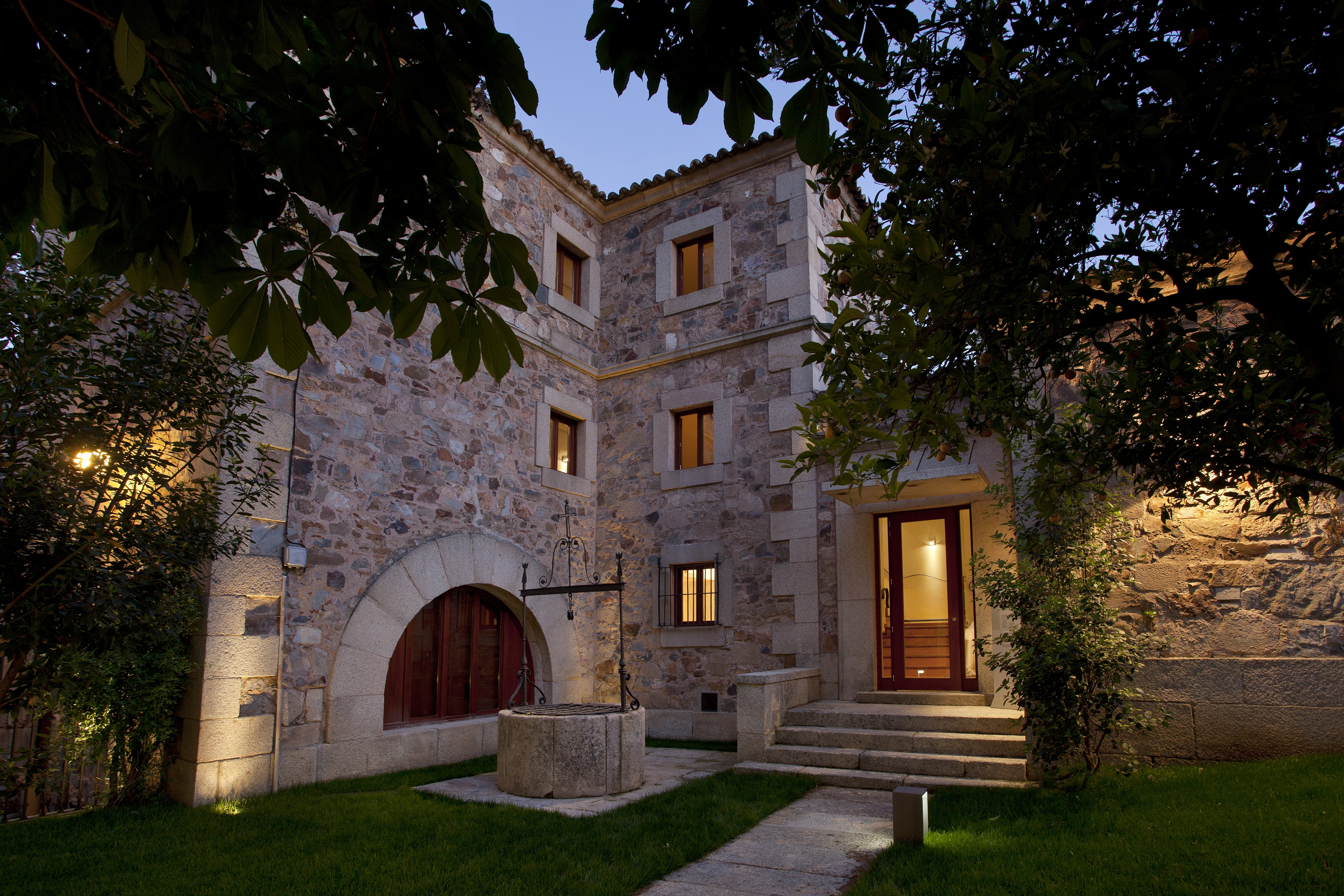
The original bar and cafetería building viewed from the patio-garden.

Internally, Picardo repeated many of his pastiche medievalisms as seen in his previous Parador projects, with much use of heavy timber, such as a dark coffered ceiling in the dining room and classic Castilian designs for windows, doors, furniture, and light fittings. Terracotta tiles were used for the floors in the bar, the dining room and the two lounges.

The Hostería de Cáceres opened on 18 May 1971.

Further work for Picardo included the complete re-roofing of the palace, which involved renewing the roof structure, because of what he described as "a degree of imminent ruin due to its terrible wooden structure", and an extension to the original dining room area by glassing-in the colonnaded portico facing the patio garden.

In 1970 Picardo had suggested to the Ministry that the rest of the palace could be converted into a full Parador, utilising the already converted Hostería. This proposal was not taken up at the time, and a Parador was opened elsewhere in the city.

The Hostería was closed in June 1984 because it was not making a profit. At that point the rest of the palace was, as Picardo had recommended, restored and converted and, with his original Hostería, opened as a full Parador with 27 guest rooms on 10 October 1989. Picardo was not involved in this work.

Subsequent expansions into neighbouring buildings have turned the Parador into a much larger establishment. Picardo's original entrance, bar and cafetería area now form a sumptuous suite, though the medieval aura of his interior decoration and furnishings for that part of the building has been lost through modernisation.

=== Parador de Carmona: Alcazar del Rey Don Pedro ===
In 1966, while building the Parador at Arcos de la Frontera, Picardo was commissioned to inspect three ancient sites near the city of Sevilla in the province of the same name in Andalucía with a view to constructing another Parador. After looking at the castle at Alcalá de Guadaíra, and the palaces of Écija, he came across the ruined castle of Carmona, the Alcázar del Rey Don Pedro (also known as the Alcázar de Arriba y Puerta de Marchena). In his subsequent report to the Ministry of Information and Tourism Picardo was enthusiastic about Carmona and provided preliminary sketch designs, which the Ministry accepted, and in 1968 he began his preparatory work.

The origin of the castle is probably Muslim, and Pedro I restored it in the 14th century into a lavish palace in Mudéjar style. It was used by the Catholic Monarchs of Spain during their final battles with the Moors in Granada. The castle was abandoned after being severely damaged in a 1504 earthquake whose epicentre was near Carmona. It was ruined even further in the Lisbon earthquake of 1755. Seven towers remained, but most of the connecting walls of the fortress were in ruins.

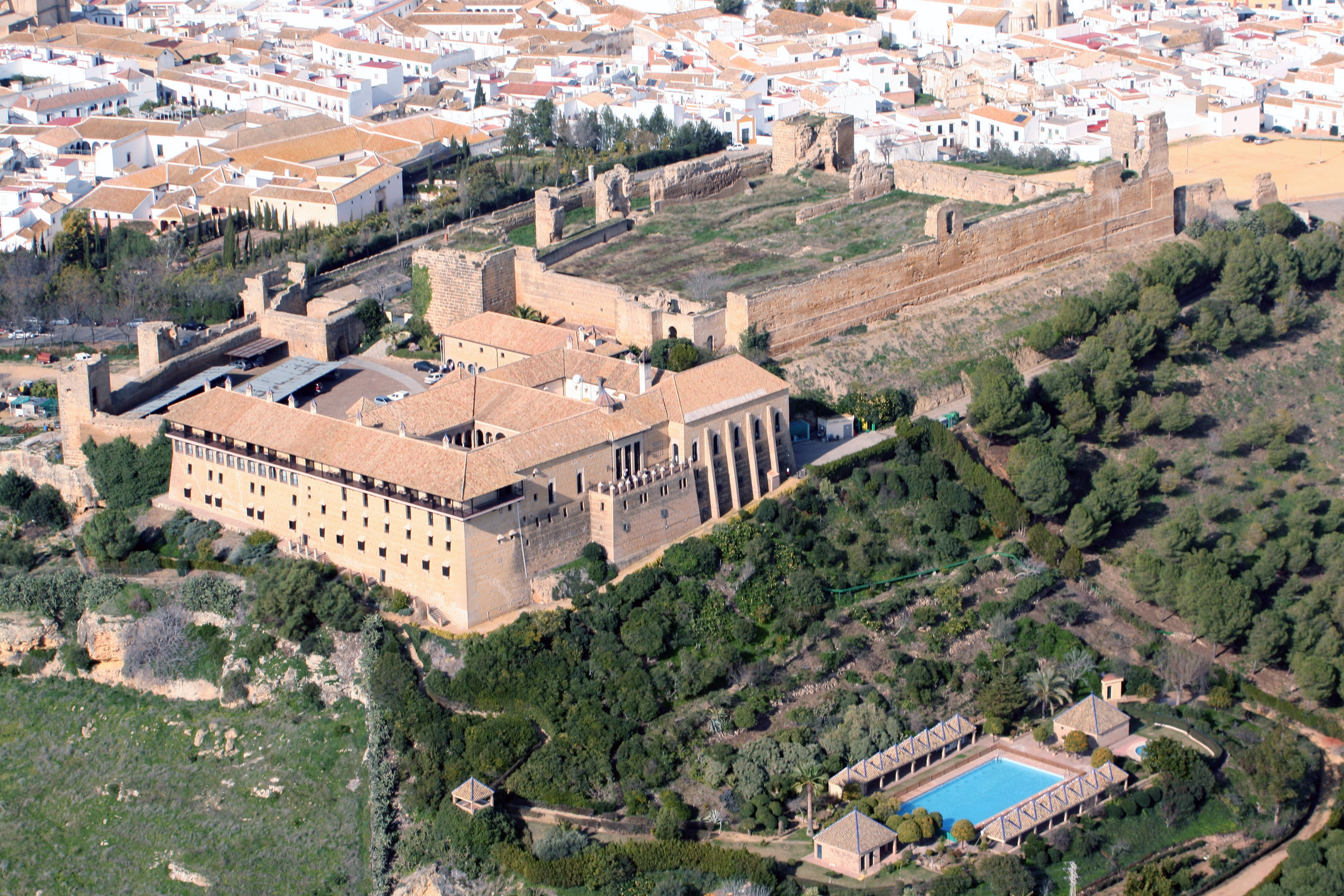
Parador de Carmona in 2008. José Luis Picardo's Parador building is to the left. On the right is the ruined castle

Picardo chose the southeast of the vast castle area, a corner known as the Plaza de Armas (parade ground) to build the Parador. Situated at the highest point of the town, the views from it were judged to be spectacular, looking far over the plains.

Picardo also resolved to position the building on the edge of the cliff overlooking the valley and overlapping the foundations of the original castle walls by such an extent that there would be space for guest rooms within the sloping walls below the Parador's ground floor.

The 1504 earthquake and Picardo's location of the building were to set up permanent problems for the Parador. In 1918 a survey of the area had revealed that the earthquake had opened a deep crack more than a metre wide in exactly the position where Picardo intended to locate the Parador's southern wall. The result was that one part of the castle's ancient wall, and the land behind it, had subsided by about 1.8 metres. As the crack and the subsidence had been concealed by rubble to a depth of about half a metre, and Picardo and his engineers were unaware of the results of previous surveys, it was not until work began in 1969 preparing for the new building that the potential instability of the ground was revealed.

The Service Geológico de Obras Públicas (the Public Works Geological Service) was brought in and located an underground fault of three to four metres. Despite that, the geologists considered the ground to be stable and decided that as long as certain protective measures to protect the foundations were taken the terrain would present sufficient resistant characteristics. Cement was injected to fill all the cavities and a reinforced concrete slab was constructed which, belatedly, allowed work on the Parador to continue.

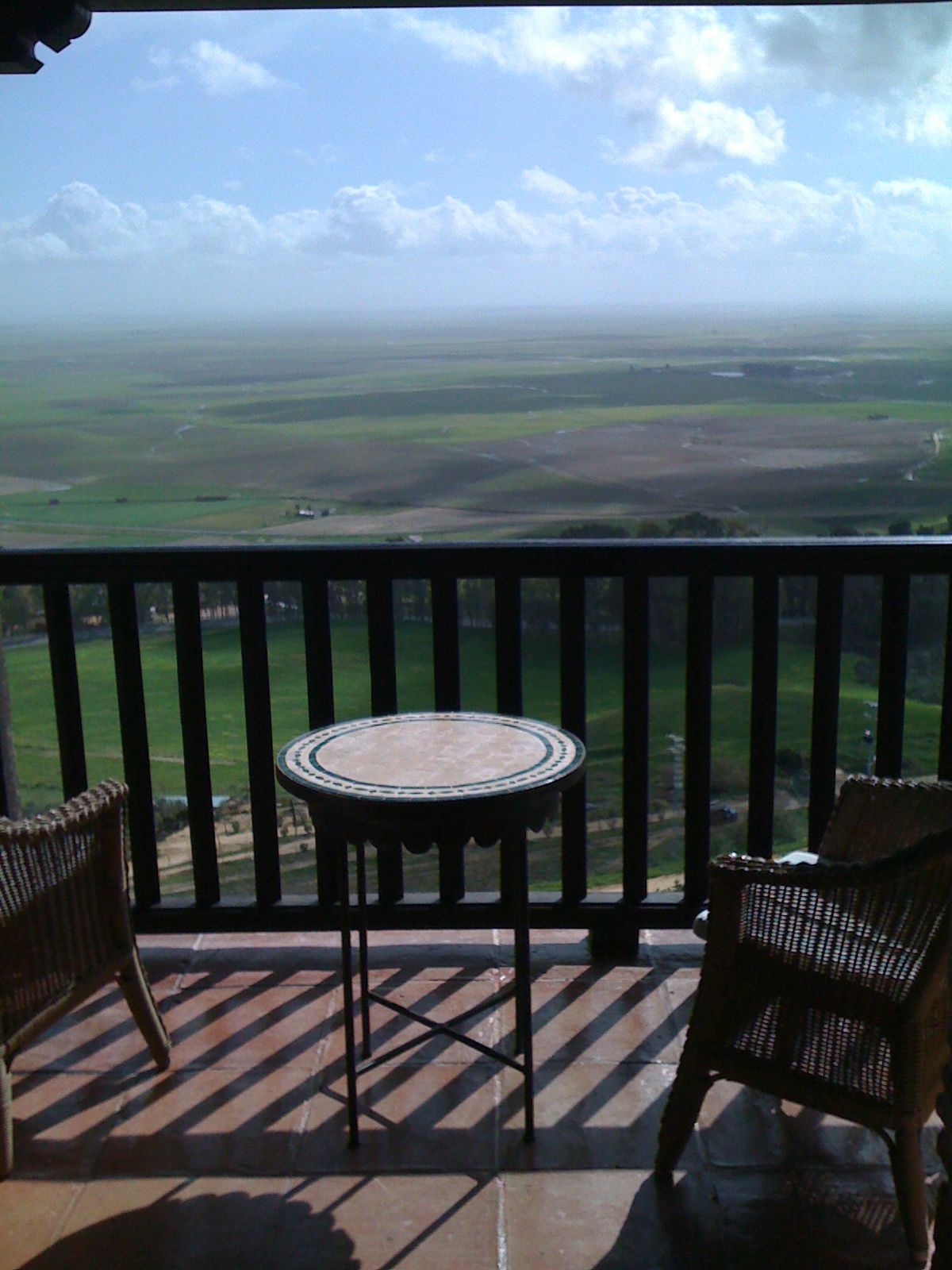
The view from a guest room terrace at the Parador de Carmona.

Picardo designed a typical Hispanic-Arabic layout with two central patios, one of which would be the centre of the public area, and the other the centre of the service department. The layout would effectively reproduce that of the original fortress. Even though it was an entirely new building, in keeping with his previous works for Paradores Picardo ensured it would be in vernacular form and would appear to be historic and as if elements of it had been there for centuries. The south and east walls of the building, which descended well below the parade ground level, would have four floors, and be sloping steeply outwards towards the ground below the cliff, allowing for the installation of rooms within them. Conversely, on the parade ground entrance side of the building there would be only two floors.

Picardo's first plan was that there would be 23 double guest rooms and 10 singles, together with the hospitality and service areas. The considerable delay in the start of building to allow the ground to be stabilised encouraged the Ministry to decide on a pre-completion expansion of the building, bringing the total guest capacity from 56 to 102. Most of the rooms would be on the southern façade with some below the Parador's access level and others in what from the outside would appear to be the third and fourth floors, with those on the top floor, just beneath the roof, benefitting from Picardo's now typical timber balconies.

The main structure of the building, as was Picardo's style, was formed of concrete, clad with ashlar and brickwork and enhanced by buttresses. The roof was formed of clay pantiles, topped with decorative chimneys of the same style as those Picardo designed for the Parador at Guadalupe, disguising guest bathroom ventilation outlets. Internally, he installed limestone columns and made much use of ceramic tiling, and brick. The floors were marble and terracotta.

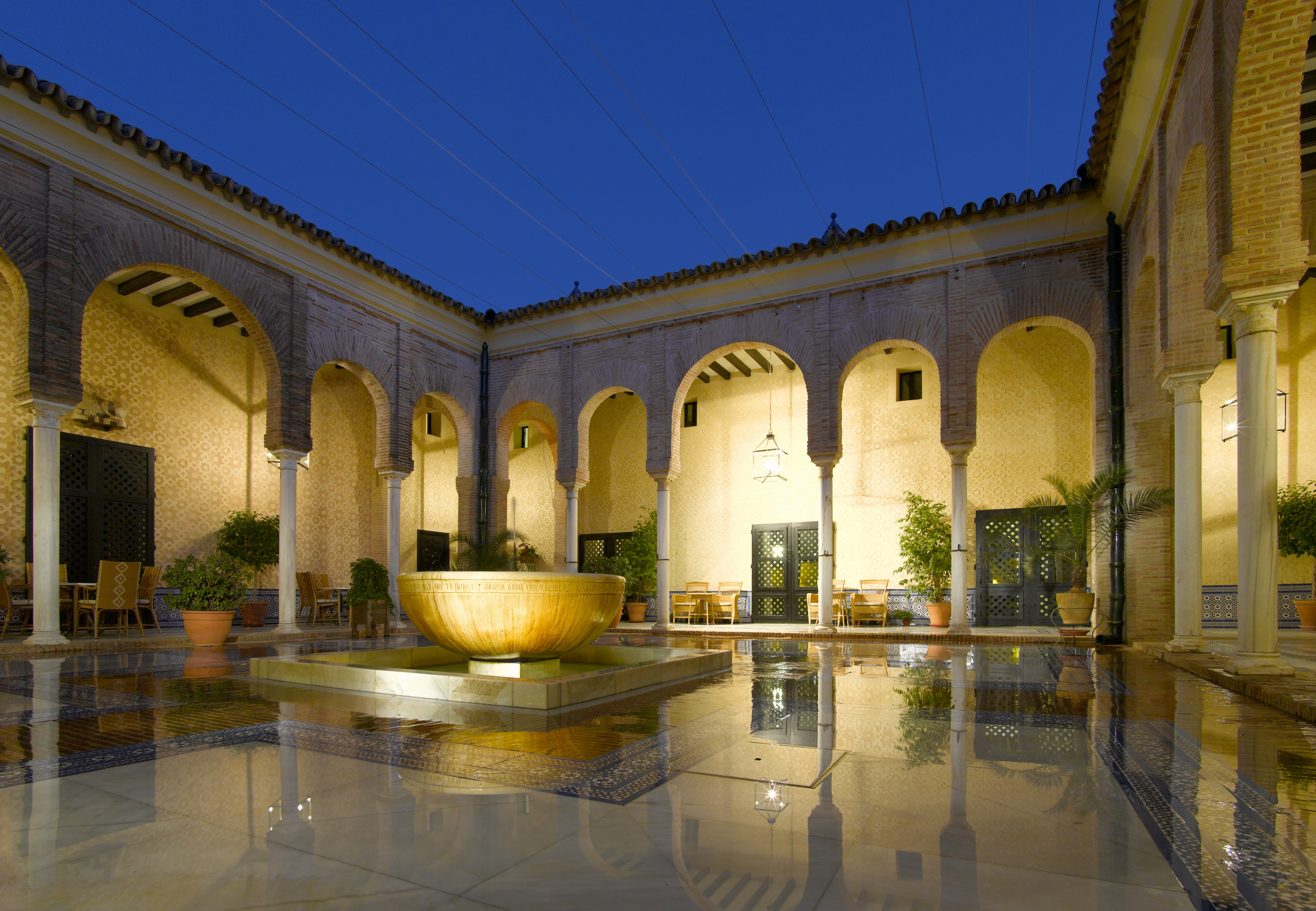
The central patio of the Parador de Carmona in 2011.

As in previous Paradores built by Picardo he had control of the interior decoration down to the smallest detail, in Carmona achieving a Hispanic-Arabic ambience of a palatial Mudéjar style, with much use of coffered ceilings and star lattice-work in wood and stone and subtle changes of style in the progression from room to room. The public patio was adorned with semi-circular arches on tall, slender pillars, while the dining room was more robustly medieval in a gothic style with exposed wooden beams and pointed arches with finely cut stone hiding the structural ironwork of the roof. Lights and furniture, door fittings and mural tiles were all designed by Picardo.

The Carmona Parador was inaugurated on 30 March 1976 by King Juan Carlos I and Queen Sofía.

In the year of the Parador's inauguration a large crack was detected parallel to the south façade, affecting the entire building. To deal with this an expansion joint was constructed that divided the building into two zones. In 1977 Picardo reported that the building had moved in the direction of the valley. He calculated the lateral displacement as 4 centimetres at the expansion joint. There was a 45 degree crack in the Parador indicating a similar degree of slippage in the ground beneath the building. Picardo also indicated a number of smaller cracks in the building, but viewed them as of minor importance.

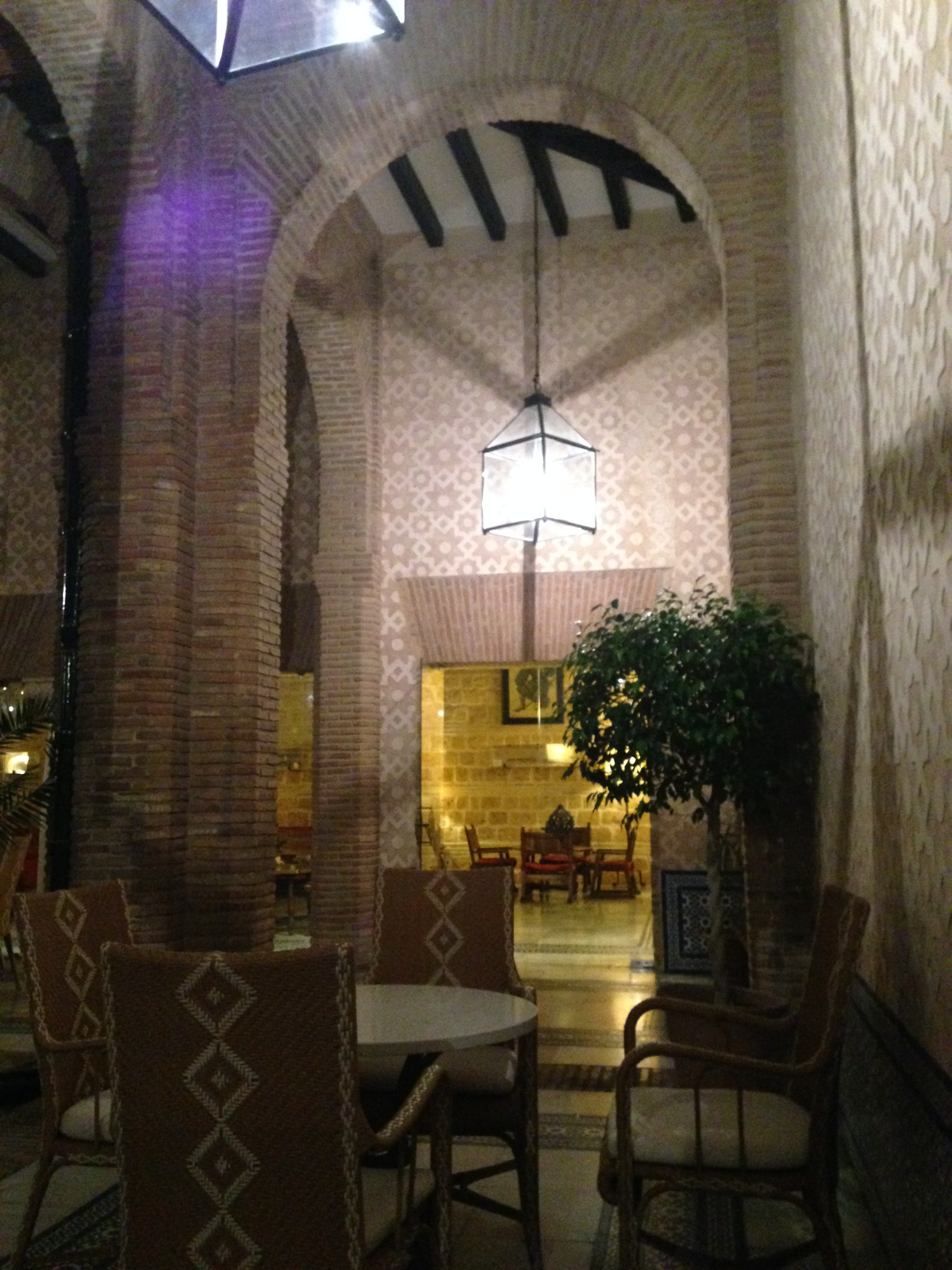
A corner of the patio of the Parador de Carmona, looking through to a lounge.

The Service Geológico de Obras Públicas was brought onto the site again to monitor the building for a period. They found that there was continuing movement, and that this was more noticeable in the rainy season. They recommended that the foundations of the south wall be underpinned.

Due to new government policy at the Ministry which required only employed personnel to work on Parador buildings, Picardo — as a freelance — could not be involved in the building's structural problems after 1978.

Despite underpinning in 1980, and in 1987 a tie beam being concreted in the ground at the foot of the south wall with anchors penetrating deep into the sandstone beneath the building, more movement was detected in 1996. In 2013 it was reported that further cracks had been detected in the area where the large cracks had first appeared in 1977. The building is considered to be seriously at risk in the event of a sharp rise in the water table, or another earthquake.

Minor improvements and modernisations were carried out in the Parador in 1982 and 1983 under the supervision of the architect Jesús Valverde Viñas. In 1987 an expansion was carried out by the architect Carlos Fernández-Cuenca Gómez which included additional guest rooms, and a new pavilion for conventions. He rigidly copied Picardo's style.

The Carmona Parador now has 9 double rooms, 51 twin rooms and 3 single rooms, making a total guest complement of 123.

=== Parador de Sigüenza: Castillo de Sigüenza ===
In 1964 Picardo was involved, with the Ministry of Information and Tourism, in investigating old buildings for conversion into a new Parador in the Province of Guadalajara. Possible locations were the castle at Atienza and the Casa del Cordón, an old inn in the same town, the castle at Molina de Aragón and the castle at Sigüenza. He considered the last to be the best proposition despite it being comprehensively ruined. It stands prominently above the town and cathedral of Sigüenza and dominates the landscape. The Ministry set about acquiring it the same year.

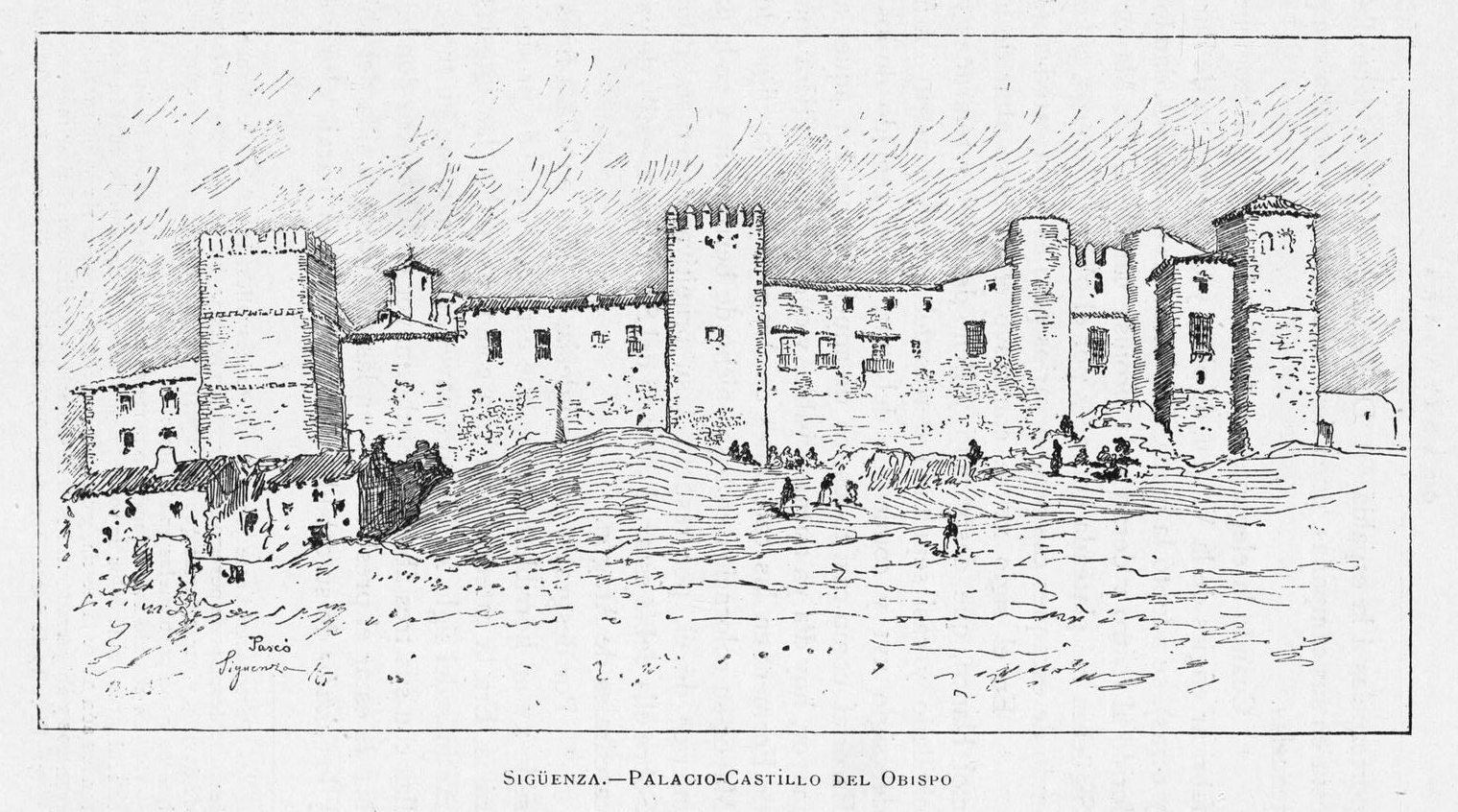
The Castillo de los Obispos, Sigüenza, seen in 1886, by Josep Pascó i Mensa.

The Castillo de los Obispos de Sigüenza (the Castle of the Bishops of Sigüenza) was a palace-fortress with Iberian, Roman, Visigothic and Moorish origins. It was enlarged and modified repeatedly between the 14th and 18th centuries, after which it declined and deteriorated, suffering progressive damage during the French invasion, the Carlist Wars, and finally during the Spanish Civil War when it was bombed by artillery and from the air during the Battle of Guadalajara in 1937. It was then left in ruins for over three decades.

Starting in October 1969 Picardo analysed the condition of the building. "The state of the castle could not have been more pitiful" he wrote years later. "Its military nature had been spoiled by converting its towers into belfries; huge windows and balconies had been opened for living quarters, particularly in the southern part of the castle which had served as the living area for the bishops; all the walls had been covered with plaster and render which hid the original stone; and an endless number of parasitic features had been patched onto it." The structure was without roofs and there were numerous collapses along the entire fortified enclosure walls. In his report to the ministry, Picardo was blunt: "La cobra de este Parador lava en sí la reconstrucción de todo el castillo, hoy en ruins." (The work on this Parador entails the reconstruction of the entire castle, now in ruins)

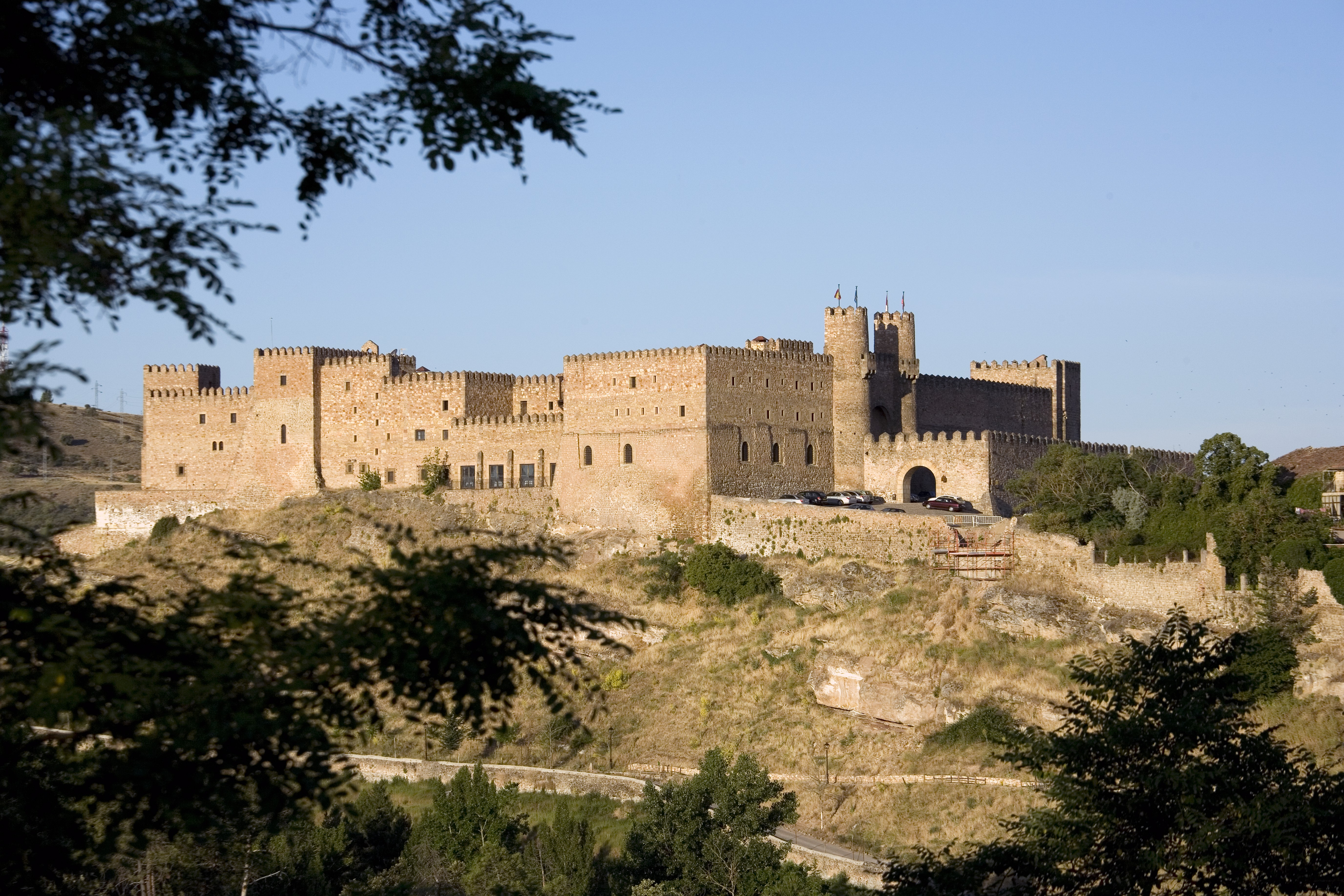
Parador de Siguenza in 2014. The main barbican entrance is on the right.

In making his plans for the castle, Picardo resolved that it would be remodelled as totally medieval, without any concession to what remained of later additions, obliviating almost all of its later history. The castle's real past was to be reinvented. Picardo later stated that "the reconversion mainly consisted of re-creating the military feeling of the castle with its towers and battlements and of leaving as much wall-facing as possible in naked stone. The most delicate part was disguising or hiding the windows of the guest rooms and of other outside rooms which would have spoiled the massive impact a castle should have."

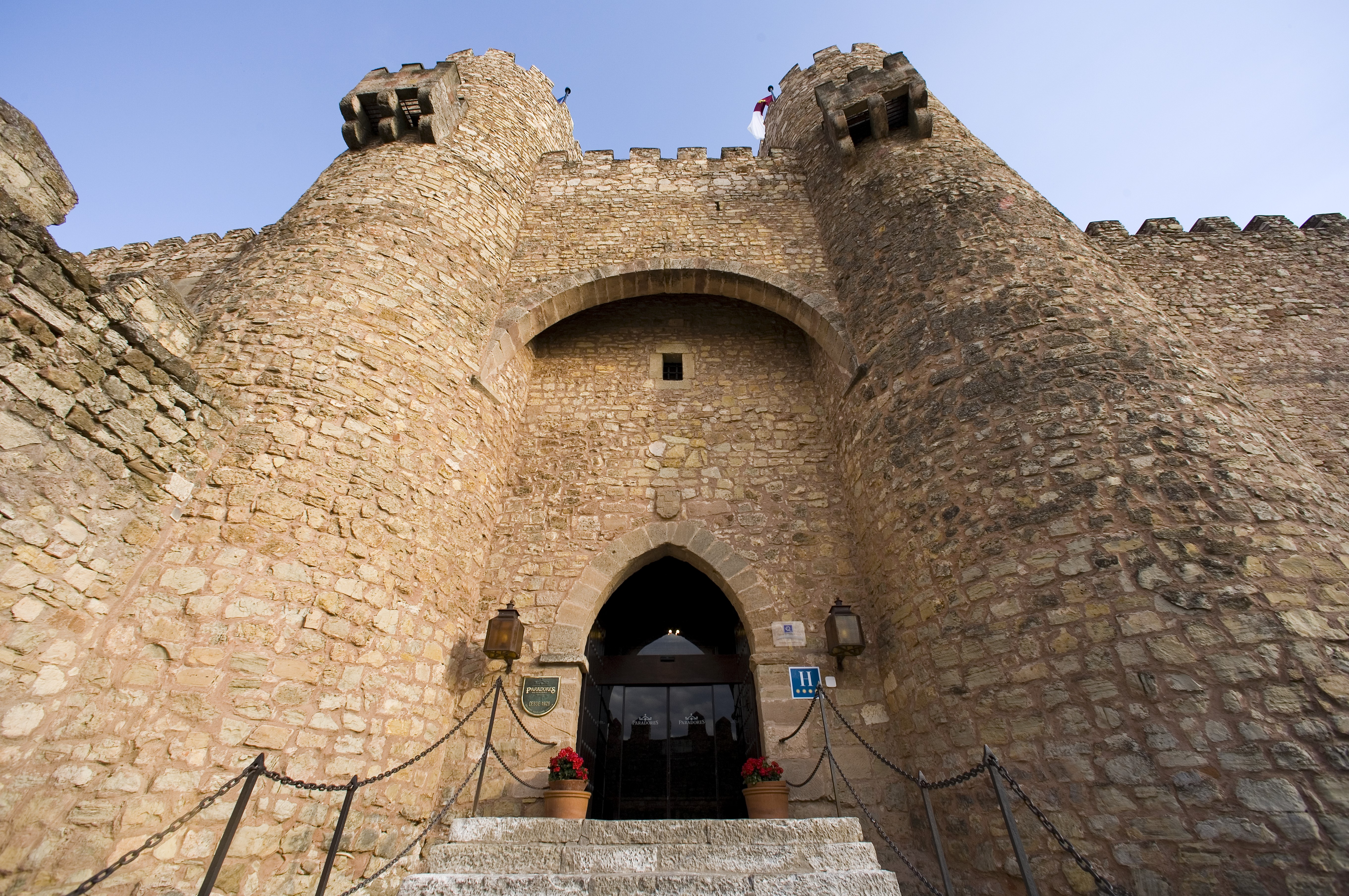
The main Barbican entry to the Parador de Sigüenza, 2014.

Work on converting the castle began in 1972. In pursuit of requiring the castle to appear entirely medieval, and as a fortress rather than as its later existence as a bishop's palace, Picardo raised most of the outer walls by at least one more storey, causing the roofs to be flat rather than sloping and allowing for the hotel accommodation required. The towers, too, were further raised, including the twin towers of the fortified gateway, the barbican, which over the centuries had been restyled almost as belfries with sloping conical roofs.

In search of a military external image Picardo removed all the large windows, balconies and other wide openings which had been cut in the original outer walls of the castle, reducing what windows had to remain in the exterior (other than those of the dining room) to their minimum in size. The parts of the walls which had been destroyed by bombardment during the Civil War were rebuilt using the remaining stone detritus to match the surviving walls. The plaster and rendering with which the exterior walls were faced (in parts in sgraffito) was removed to reveal the original bare stone. Later buildings attached to the exterior of the building were demolished and any extraneous cladding was removed. All the surrounding walls and towers were crenellated.

Picardo cleared the central courtyard of all the post-medieval accretions. His criterion was what he termed "unidid de estilo" (unity of style): clearing the property of all non-medieval additions because he felt they distorted the castle's "guerrero" (warrior) intensity. 40,000 tons of debris were removed from the courtyard.

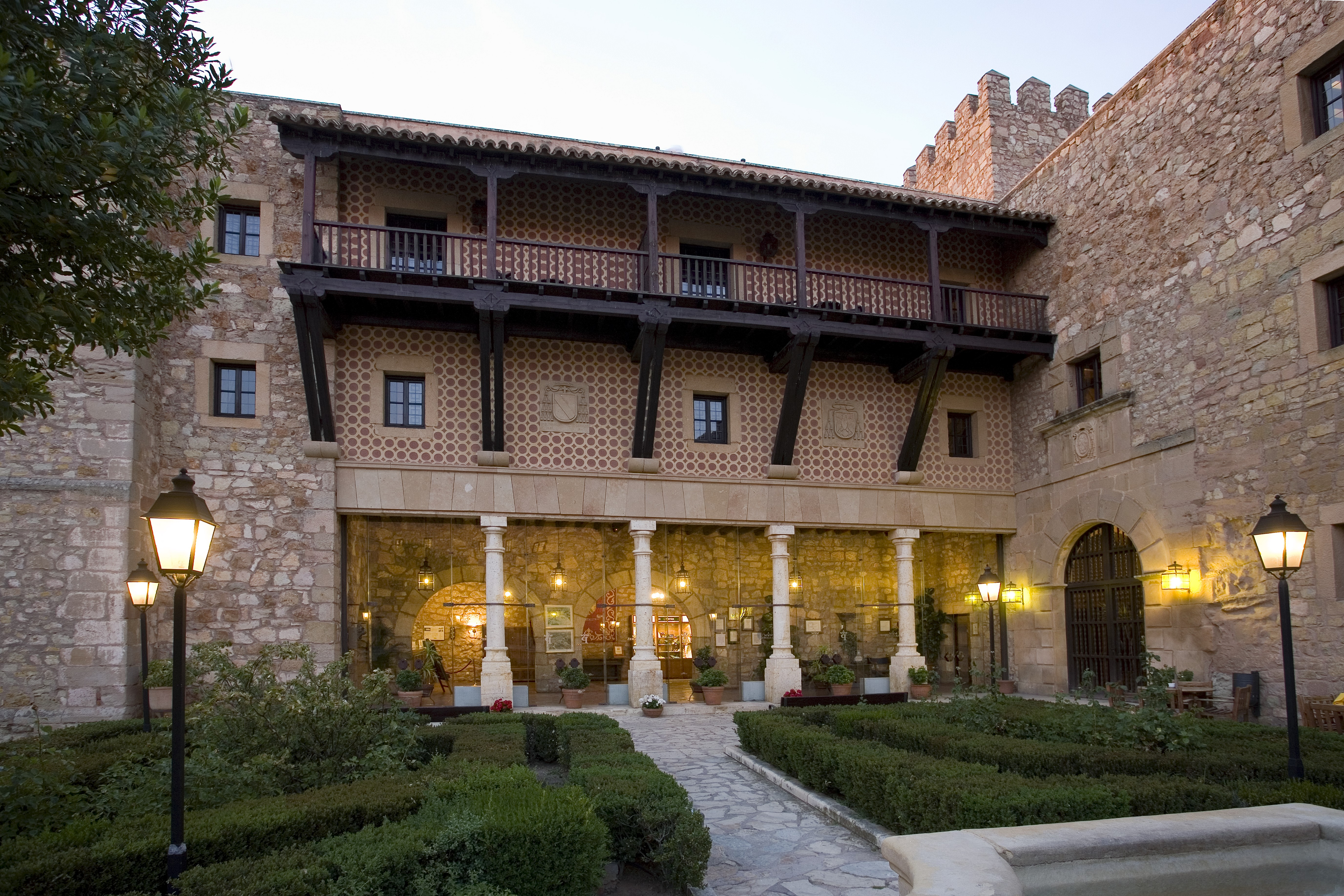
The north façade of the courtyard of the Parador de Siguenza in 2014

In his reconstruction of the interior of the castle Picardo exercised the standard practice of the Paradores network, and of which he was deemed to be the master, of using steel, reinforced concrete, blockwork and cement to erect the basic structure but hiding those modern elements behind a faked historical veneer of walls, beams, arches, and cladding made of stone, brick, timber and iron. Because the ingress of light to the interior of the building had been reduced by the minimising of the size of the exterior windows that remained, daylight had to reach the interior by making many window openings in the courtyard walls.

On the north wall of the courtyard and approached from the outside by the barbican towers, Picardo installed the main reception area and rebuilt a portico area with pillars and intermediate glass. Above were bedrooms with balconied terraces erected in his signature timber style. He repeated the historical rendering of the exterior facades of the castle which had been decorated with sgraffito, and which he had removed, by replicating the decoration on the northern walls of the courtyard.

In the northeast corner of the ground floor had been the bishops' throne room, and Picardo here installed the main guest lounge, a lofty room with a timber-beamed ceiling and two large fireplaces and chimneys. On the east side of the ground floor was the dining room, with the building's only large windows, which looked out onto the wooded ravine of the Arroyo Vadillo. The room used Picardo's favoured powerful stone vaulting to hide the steel supporting structure of the floor above.

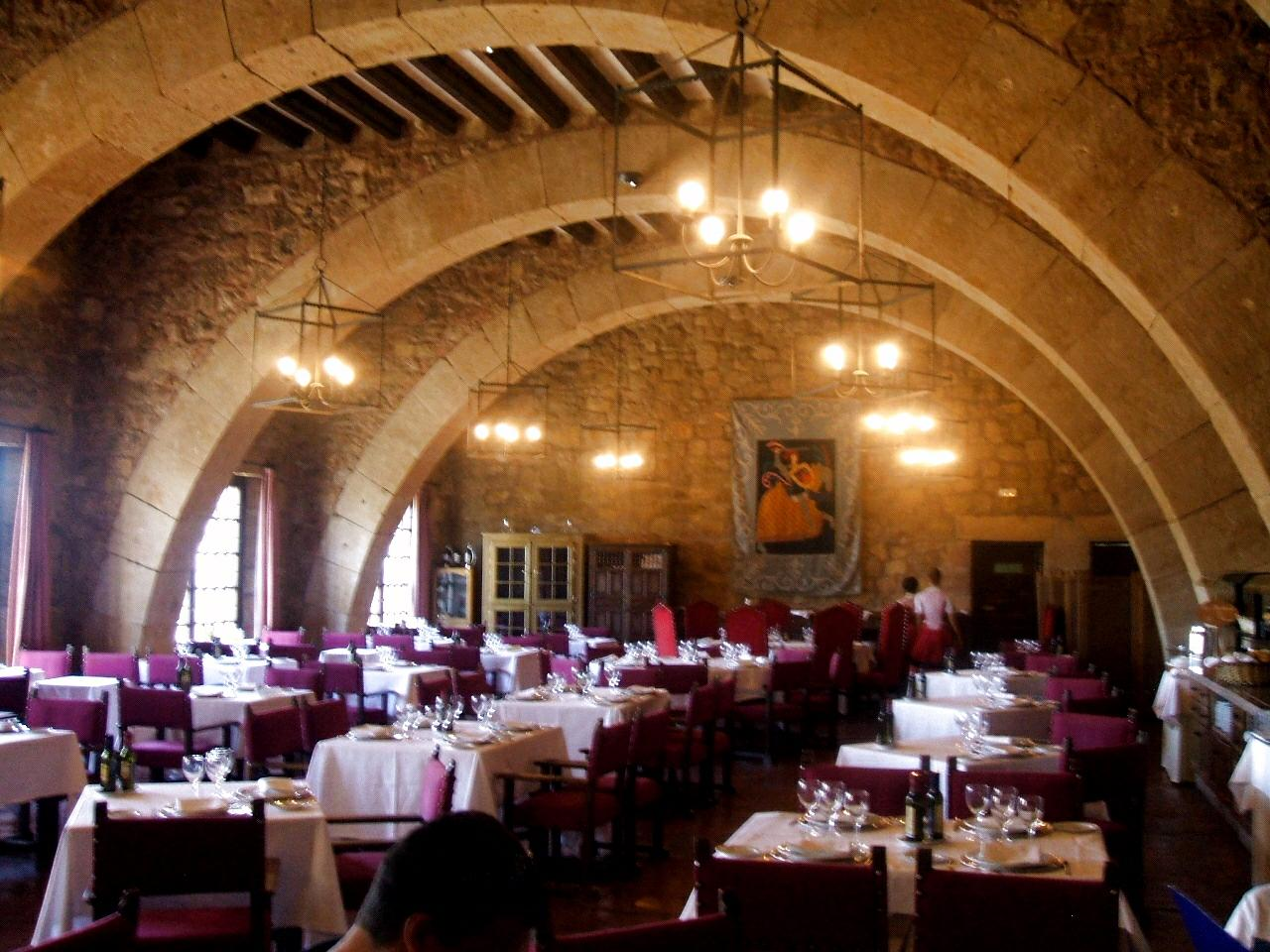
The dining room of the Parador de Sigüenza, 2009

On the courtyard side of the dining room he placed a similarly vaulted bar and café. Wide wooden staircases on this eastern side led to the first and second floor bedrooms, a few of which were in the northeast tower with windows looking over the town, and some towards the south, but most looking into the courtyard with those on the upper floor benefitting from Picardo's typical balconies. Another lounge with a wooden coffered ceiling was located on the first floor. Picardo took care to preserve one of the oldest rooms of the castle, the original chapel.

A further much smaller, three-storied pastiche monastic courtyard with semi-circular arches was built at the southern end of the castle which had sustained the most damage in the Civil War bombardment, with more guest rooms arranged around it. On the inner face of the west wall the original wine cellars, dungeons, granaries, bakeries and stables were removed and against this wall Picardo installed a 65 metres long banqueting hall with his familiar stone vaulting, and an attached bar room. Below this hall he installed large service areas.

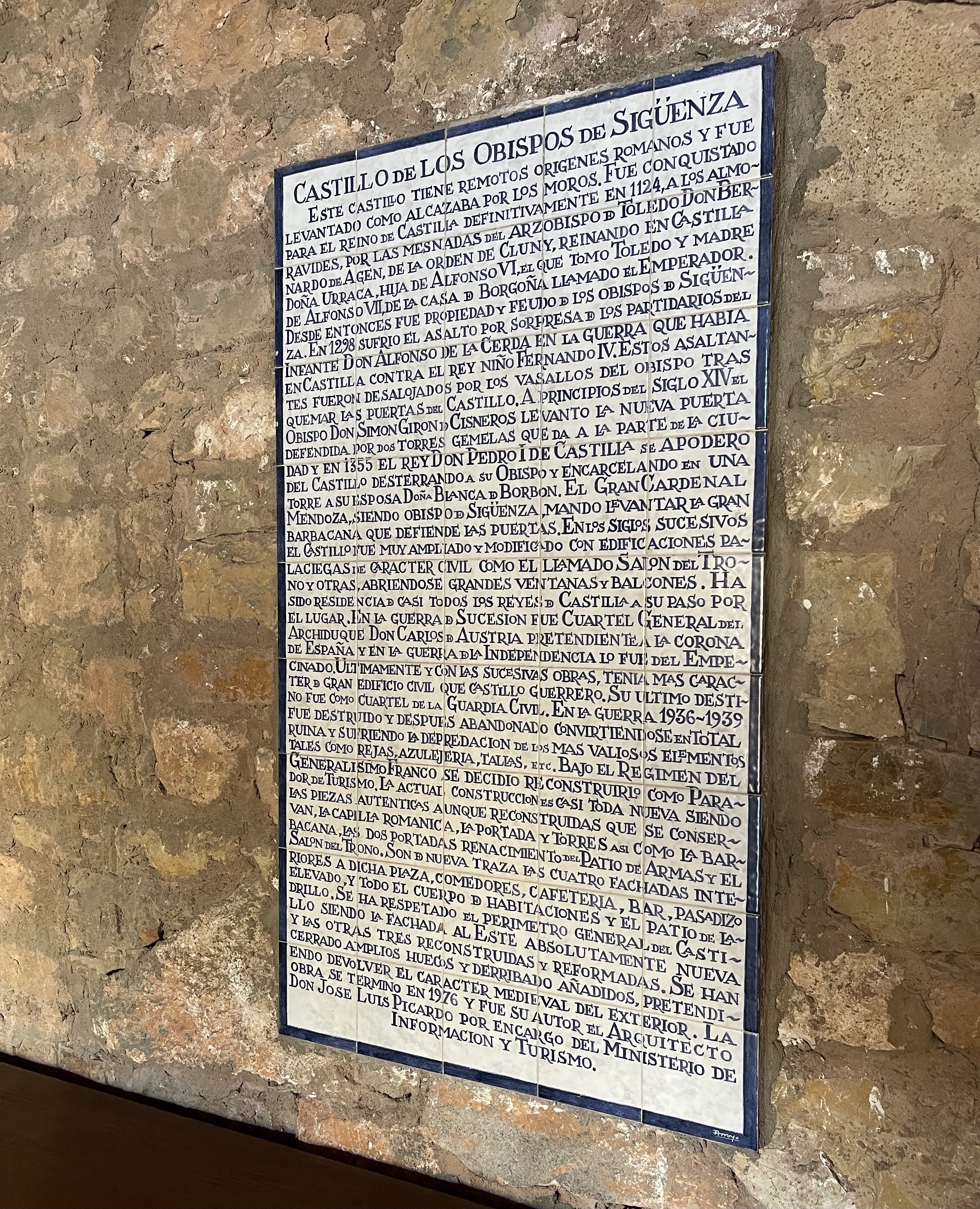
Parador de Sigüenza. A ceramic tile cartouche telling the castle's history and the story of its conversion into a Parador. Written by José Luis Picardo and produced by Juan Manuel Arroyo in 1976.

Picardo, as usual, provided his own interior decor, with special attention to the medieval. He designed classic Castilian-style furniture, flooring, rugs, doors, windows, light fittings, mirrors, heraldic displays, seigneurial crests, banners, explanatory mosaics and so on, everything down to the smallest detail. Picardo built 38 guest rooms and one suite on the first floor, and 42 rooms and one suite on the second floor, providing space for 162 guests.

On the wall of the main entrance hall Picardo placed a mural consisting of 45 tiles making up a cartouche recounting, in his own words, the history of the Castillo de los Obispos de Sigüenza accompanied by a description of the physical work carried out in restoring the building. "La actual construcción es casi toda nueva ..." (The present building is almost all new ...) Picardo declaimed. He continued (translated into English): "... the authentic parts being preserved, though reconstructed, the Romanesque chapel, the entrance and towers as well as the barbican, the two Renaissance doorways of the parade ground and the throne room. … The perimeter of the castle has been respected, the eastern façade being completely new and the other three reconstructed and remodelled. Wide gaps have been closed and additions have been demolished, trying to restore the medieval character of the exterior." He goes on to say the work was completed in 1976 and that he, Don José Luis Picardo, was the architect.

The Parador opened to the public on 20 July 1976 and the first stage of building work was finished in November of that year. It was inaugurated by King Juan Carlos and Queen Sofía in April 1978. Sigüenza was to be Picardo's last major project for the Paradores.

Remodelling and modernisation of the Parador took place in 1990 under the direction of the architect Carlos Fernández-Cuenca Gómez who scrupulously followed Picardo's style. Despite these further works, the Parador has kept its original character as established by Picardo. Most of the improvements have been only to modernise the services and facilities.

=== Other Parador projects ===
In the 1960s and 1970s Picardo was called upon by the Ministry of Information and Tourism to investigate and report on a number of other old buildings for possible conversion into Paradores. He drew up proposals and plans for a number of these buildings but, despite detailed work on some of them, they did not become Paradores within his working life or were completed by other architects. Picardo was also asked to review proposed works for similar buildings to be restored by other architects, and to develop ideas for improvements to existing Paradores.

Among the most advanced plans Picardo drew up were in 1969 for the renovation and conversion into a Parador of the castle at Puebla de Alcocer, a small municipality 70 miles east of Mérida in the Province of Badajoz in Extremadura. His draft plans show that a multitude of openings would have to have been made in the outside walls for windows. An access road was built, but ultimately the project did not materialise.

Another project, in 1970, was the conversion into a Parador of the 11th century remains of the castle in Monzón, in the Province of Huesca in Aragon, but Picardo judged the project to be unviable and the idea was abandoned by 1972. (Note: This castle should not be confused with the castle in Monzón de Campos in the Province of Palencia in Castilla y León, which was converted into a Parador and functioned as such from 1975 to 1988.)

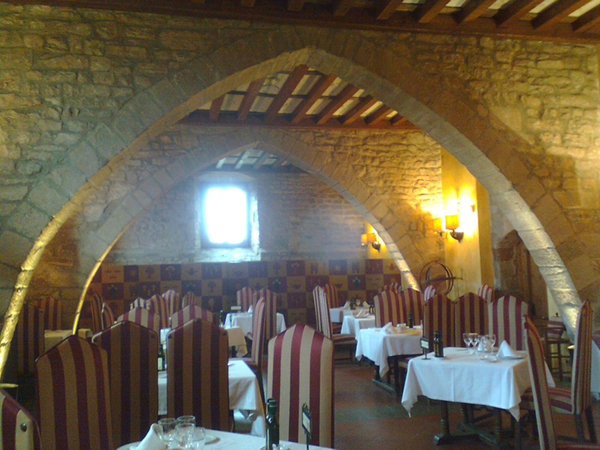
The influence of José Luis Picardo is seen in the design for the dining room of the Parador de Cardona.

Among other buildings Picardo reported on were three for which he executed preliminary designs and drawings and which later became Paradores, though he was not involved in their completion. They were, in 1963, the old palace at Olite in Navarra, in March 1969 the Castillo de la Zuda at Tortosa in the Province of Tarragona in Cataluña and in 1970 the castle at Cardona in the Province of Barcelona in Cataluña.

Picardo surveyed several other buildings which were ultimately destined not to become Paradores. Among them were the Castillo de San Antón at A Coruña in 1968, the Posada del Cordón at Atienza in the province of Guadalajara in 1969, in 1970 the Palacio del Deán and the Palacio del Dr Trujillo at Plasencia in the province of Cáceres in Extremadura, and in 1971 the Castillo de Segunto near Valencia. Also in 1971 Picardo inspected the castle at Molina de Aragón in the province of Guadalajara, (Note: Though Picardo did not judge it appropriate in 1971 to proceed with the development of a Parador at Molina de Aragón, the building of a Parador there has now taken place, though as a modern building overlooking the castle rather than a conversion of the castle itself.) and possibly also in 1971 the Castillo de Valderrobres in Teruel in Aragon. In 1972 he surveyed the castle at Trujillo in the province of Cáceres in Extremadura, (Note: The castle at Trujillo, which Picardo rejected as a Parador project, should not be confused with the convent of Santa Clara in Trujillo which later became a Parador.) the cave houses of Mesón Gitano (now known as the yacimiento arqueológico Barrio Almohadí (archeological site Barrio Almohadí) and the nearby Alcazaba of Almería, and the castle-fortress at Aracena in the Province of Huelva in Andalucía. In 1975 he also developed improvements for one of the earliest existing Paradores, opened in 1929, the castle at Ciudad Rodrigo in the Province of Salamanca in Castilla y León.

=== Controversial legacy of Picardo's Paradores ===
It was not unusual in Spain in the 1960s and 1970s for the rehabilitation of castles and convents (not all destined to be Paradores) to be carried out without archeological research either before work began, which would have added to expense and delayed the project, or while work was being carried out. Instead, Picardo's rebuilding projects were planned mostly on the basis of his own historical and architectural research. The hotel conversions and the demolition of large parts of monumental buildings without detailed investigation and record-keeping was frowned upon in the 1960s and 1970s, and over half a century later is seen by archeologists and historians as a matter of significant controversy and regret. Picardo's work at Sigüenza, in particular, converting a castle-palace into a Parador, has been decried as "medieval scenery for tourist accommodation".

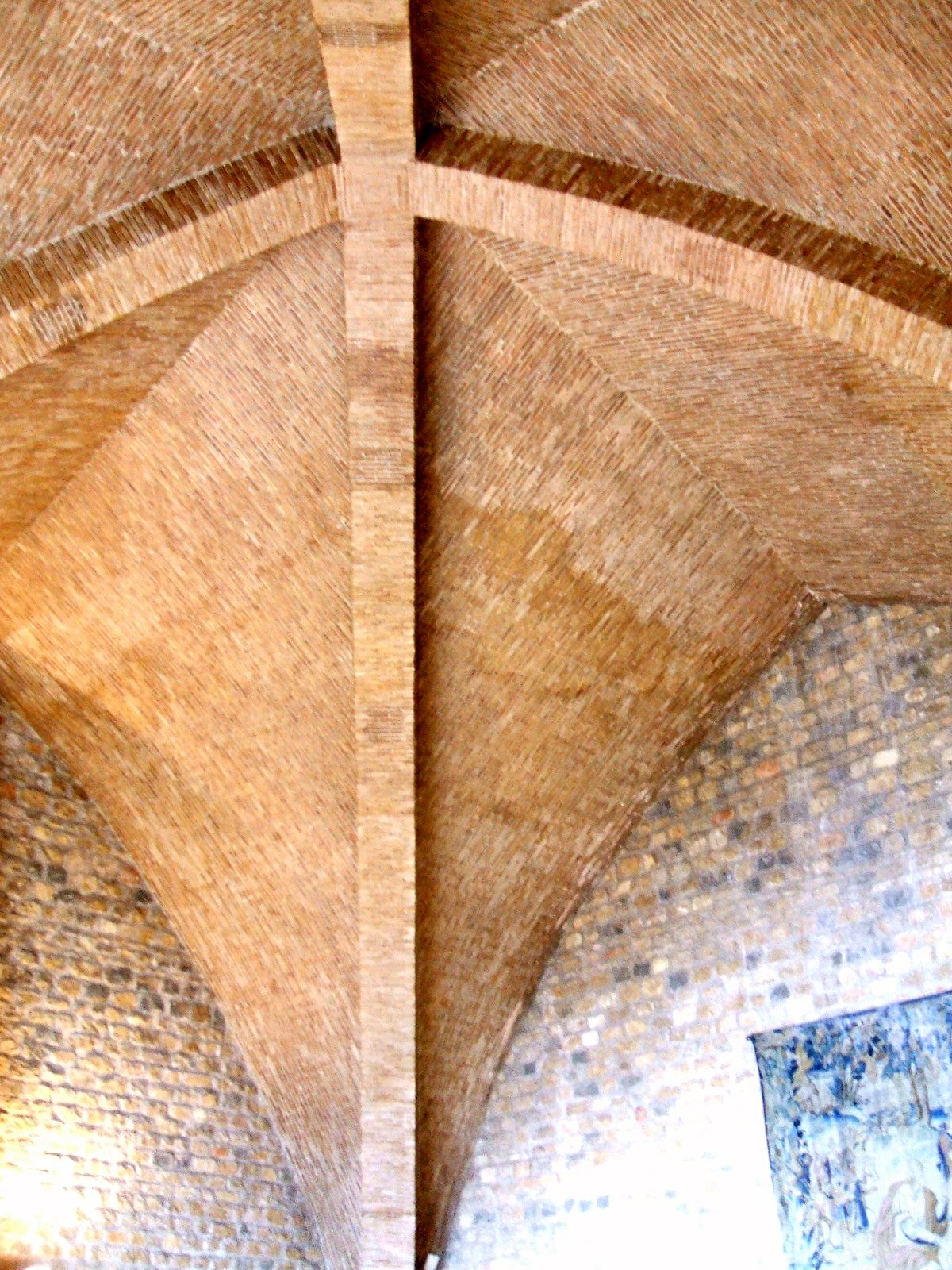
"... in his work we can find an impressive rib vault supported by a hidden metallic substructure ..." Part of a ceiling at the Parador de Jaén.

The leading researcher into the architectural history of the Paradores network and its restoration of architectural heritage, Dr María José Rodríguez Pérez, has extensively documented and studied the work of Picardo and his fellow Paradores architects of the 1960s and 1970s in her lengthy and detailed doctoral thesis and subsequent books and publications. She has described the architects' objective as being escenografía convincente (convincing set design) to evoke the historical era considered to be of interest to tourists, generally the medieval period. In writing of the new extensions which were designed to be identical to the monuments to which they were attached — Picardo's Parador at Jäen is a good example — she has described them as being "falso histórico" (false history) ... "a replica whose documentary value has been masked or even lost".

In Picardo's defence, his early mentor Fernando Choeca Goitia defined him as "un arquitecto sue entiende la arquitectura como arte" (an architect who understands architecture as art). Picardo himself maintained: "El Arte es eterno ..."(Art is eternal ...), "...it is always current. The reconstructions of the castles are really false. If they are Art, they are justified and if they are not, they are truly condemnable."

Picardo had no qualms about his film set concept of restoration, using modern construction techniques and concealing them with traditional materials, as long as the buildings looked old rather than modern. One Spanish academic, an assistant professor of architecture and design, writing of Picardo's artistry, has stated: "The end ... justified the means, in such a way that in his work we can find an impressive rib vault supported by a hidden metallic substructure, a coffered ceiling suspended from a concrete slab or a stone retaining wall with a reinforced concrete core." He goes on to say that faced with the dilemma of adopting a "mimetic and conservative attitude or a more modern and disruptive approach", Picardo claimed supremacy for Art. "En Arte todo es posible" (In Art everything is possible), wrote Picardo in 1994. "A good architect will know how to weigh up both solutions and his sensitivity shall dictate his choice."

Despite the current views of historians, Picardo's Paradores — particularly those at Jäen, Carmona and Sigüenza — though pastiche, remain amongst the most popular of the network's hotels. One United States travel writer enthused about Jäen: "I love this parador, so dramatic in its setting, so theatrically conceived ... Inside, the deception is masterly, creating an ambience as old and austere as it is surrealistic and extravagant."

== Palacio de Gamazo ==
A notable restoration project for Picardo, aside from the Paradores, was the late nineteenth century Palacio de Gamazo on the Calle de Génova in Madrid. It was built for the Spanish politician and lawyer Germán Gamazo (1840–1901), whose son Juan Antonio Gamazo became the first Conde de Gamazo (Count of Gamazo). Designed in neoclassical style by Ricardo Velázquez Bosco in 1886–88 as a domestic habitation for the Gamazo family, by the 1970s and under new ownership the building had fallen into dereliction. Demolition began in the mid-1970s, but pressure from admirers of the house and of Bosco's work, aided by architecture students who occupied what remained of the building, brought an official stop to its destruction in April 1977. In 1978 it was declared a monumento histórico-artístico de carácter nacional (national historic-artistic monument).

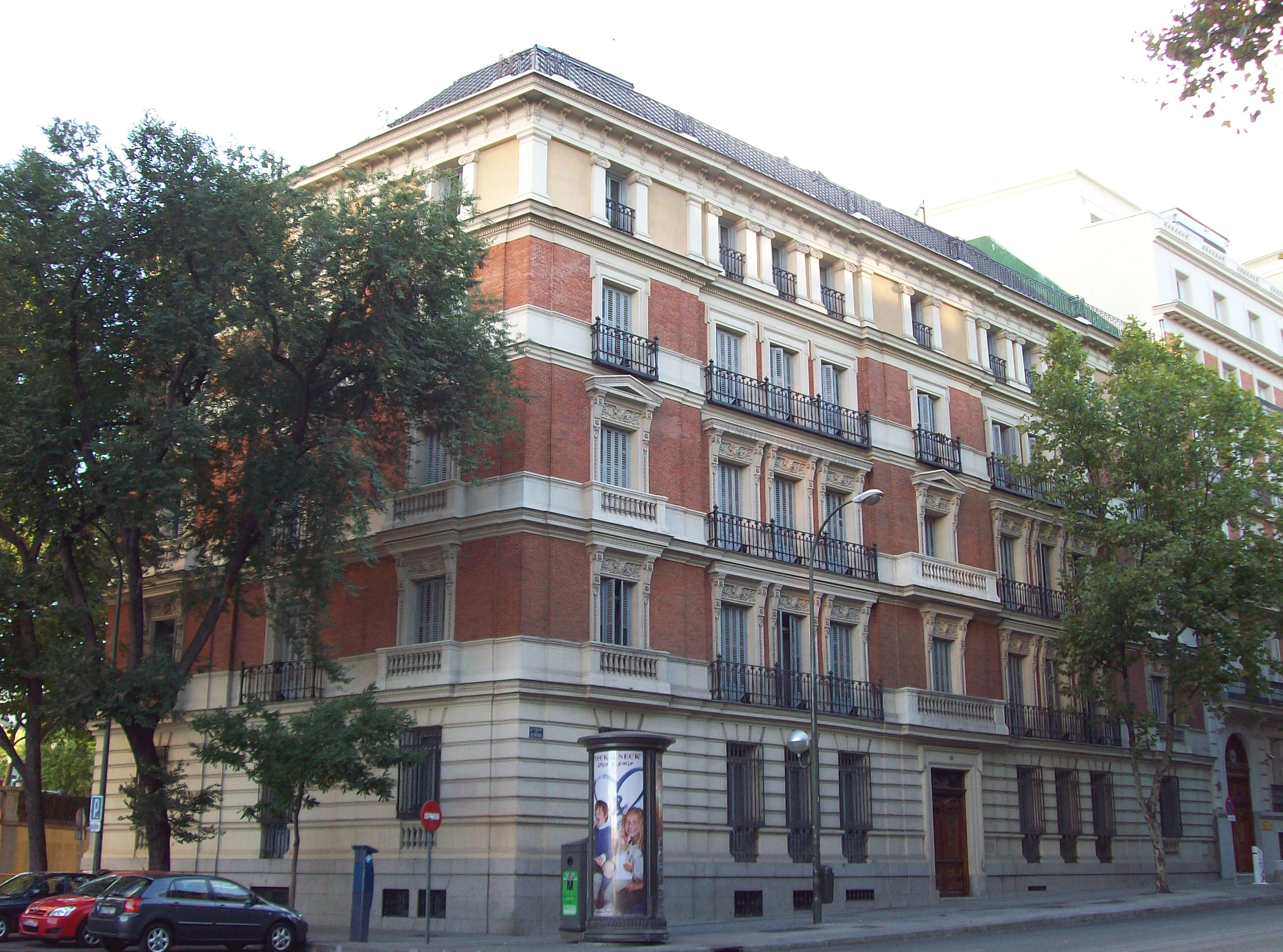
The Palacio de Gamazo, 2011

Picardo was commissioned to restore the building for use as office space, rebuilding where necessary and preserving the three bichrome façades. The gentle slope of Calle de Genóva is rationalised at the base with a granite plinth. Above that is red brick, and cream Novelda stone used for the decoration of lintels and mouldings and the formation of bold horizontal fascia lines. There were four main floors and an attic, with balconies on the second, third and fourth floors of the façades and smaller ones in the attic.

Picardo began the physical work of restoration in 1980 and completed it in 1982. Despite the earlier demolition work, Picardo was able to preserve and rebuild the façades in their totality, much to his satisfaction.

The building's interior has since been further rehabilitated for the requirements of modern office technology and a set back mansard roof has been erected to enable the addition of a further floor, but these changes have not impinged on Picardo's restoration of the façades.

== Other historical restorations ==
During the course of his career Picardo carried out numerous restorations on old buildings in Spain. Demonstrating his educated and precise knowledge of classical styles, he carried out restoration works on, amongst many other buildings, the Catedral de Cádiz, deleteriously affected by salt from being near the sea, the Real Monasterio de Santa María de Guadalupe, the Catedral de Santa María de Sigüenza, damaged during the Civil War, and in the tiny Ermita del Humilladero in the Sierra de Villuercas. He rehabilitated the Antiguo Palacio del Marqués de Montana (also known as Palacio Domecq) in Jerez and restored the Castillo de San Felipe in Puerto de la Cruz de Tenerife.

== Fundación Juan March ==
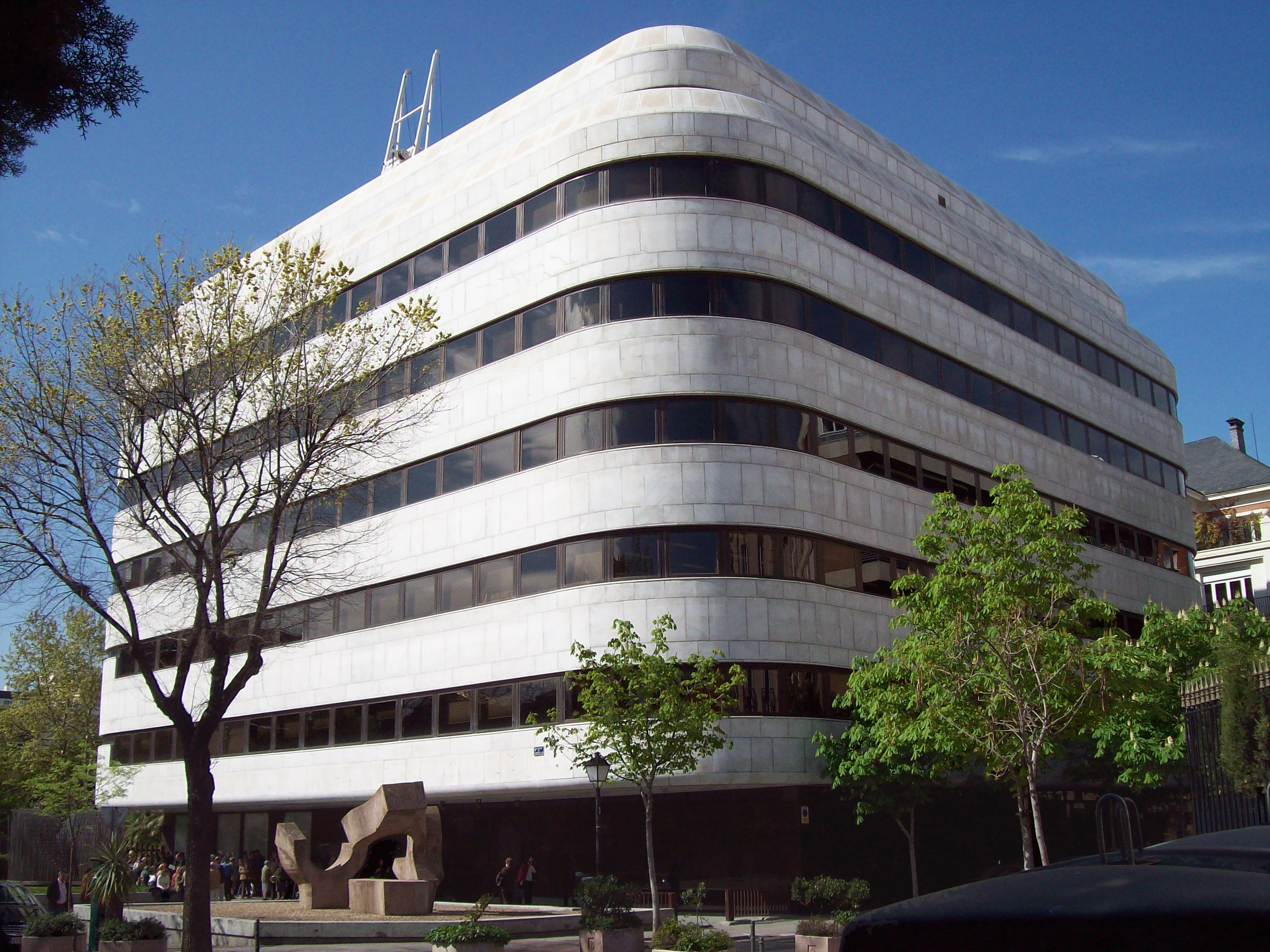
Fundación Juan March, Madrid. Photographed by Luis García in 2009.

In 1970 Picardo was invited to compete with fellow notable architects Javier Carvajal Ferrer and Mariano García Benito for the contract to design and build a new headquarters building in the Salamanca neighbourhood of Madrid for the Fundación Juan March (Juan March Foundation) which promotes Spanish culture and science. He was asked to take part after Juan March himself was impressed by Picardo's work at the Parador in Jaén. In 1971, Picardo, after seeking inspiration in the buildings of Greece and New York which he claimed provided "two basic architectural references: the classic perfection of the Parthenon and the constructive audacity of the new languages of New York", Picardo's design won the competition and he was awarded the contract for the building.

Picardo designed a building of "extreme simplicity and elegance, of great architectural beauty and modernity". Located between Calle de Castelló and Calle de Padilla, the building, started in 1972, consisted of seven floors at ground level and above, measuring 1,400 square metres in all, and four below ground, measuring 3,000 square metres. Picardo's purpose in burying most of the building below ground was to obtain the maximum amount of free land for the garden. It was conceived as a cube with the same dimensions on each of the four façades and designed with continuous horizontal banding without break around the corners.

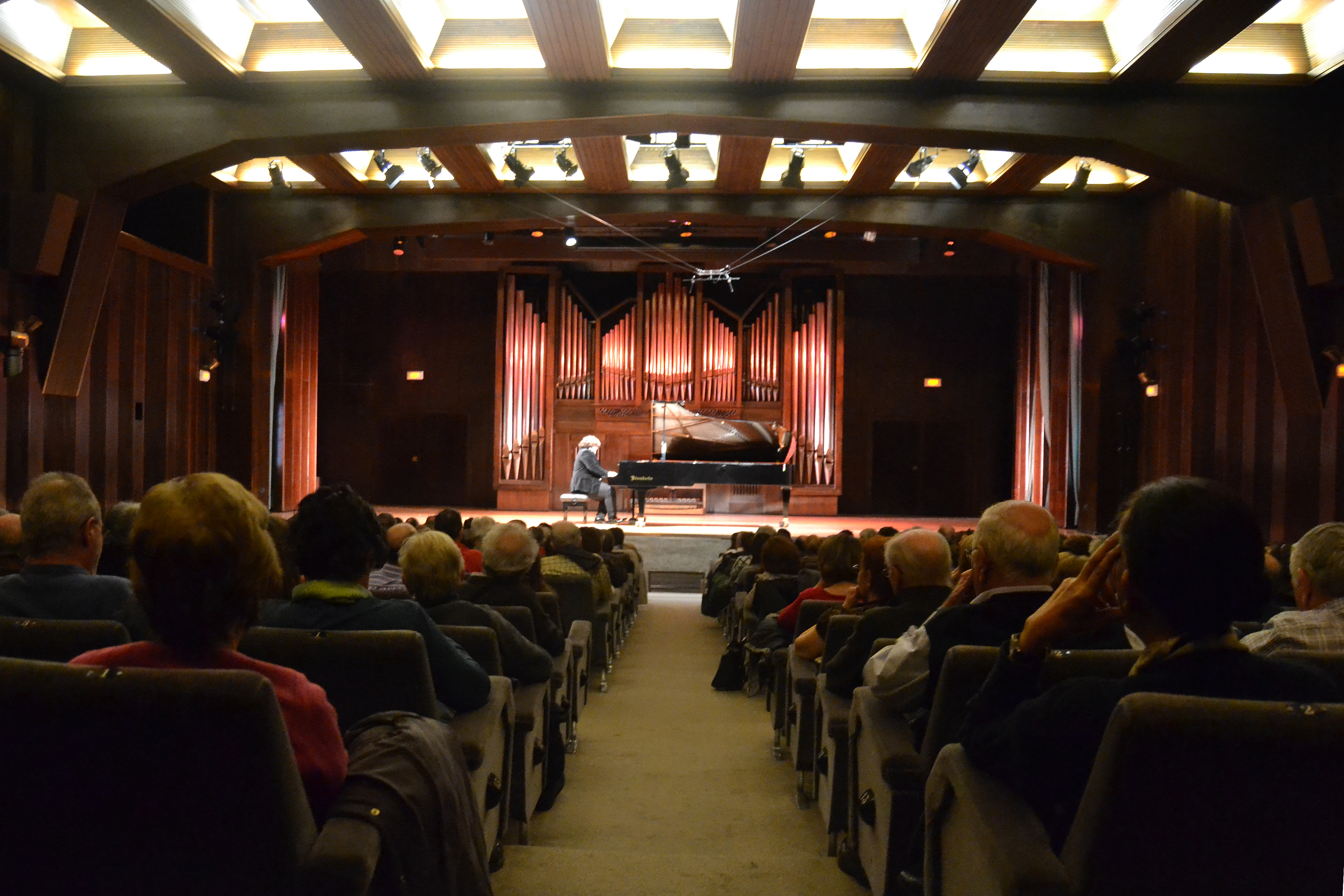
The concert hall in the headquarters of the Fundación Juan March in 2015, designed by José Luis Picardo. The organ was removed in 2019.

The ribbon windows, formed of near-black anodised aluminium frames and dark coloured glass, alternated with bands of white Carrara marble cladding laid in a uniquely patterned bond. Black and white were to be the dominant colours, but Picardo, for reasons of time, was forced to accept an off-white marble mistakenly delivered for the façades rather than the pure white that was ordered.

For the interior of the building Picardo designed several assembly halls, auditoria for concerts, theatre, cinema and conferences, along with numerous exhibition and gallery spaces, libraries, offices, Council rooms, conveniences and two floors of car parking below ground. The predominant materials used inside the building were white marble, bronze and walnut, with much carpeting and a wide staircase with fabric walls. The dominant colours were dark brown and beige.

In detail, Picardo set a large entrance hall and an exhibition space of more than 400 square metres on the ground floor, administration and the archive department on the first floor, a library with reading rooms and book storage on the second floor, and offices, meeting rooms and banqueting areas and reserve space on the remaining upper floors.

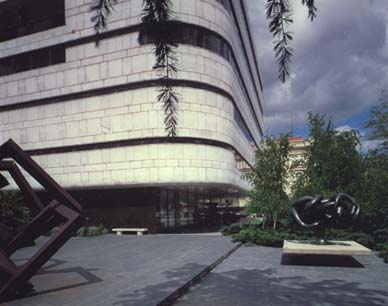
A corner of the sculpture garden at the headquarters of the Fundación Juan March

Two of the basement floors were dedicated to car parking for about 100 cars and for services, while another basement floor housed two venues for events, conferences, concerts and theatre performances, one of them with 300 seats, the other with 100. A large hall connected the two performance spaces.

Picardo integrated pictorial and sculptural works into the architecture itself and many pieces were produced by artists and sculptors specifically for the building. Among them were sculptures by Eduardo Chillida and Pablo Serrano and a mural by Joaquín Vaquero Turcios. Prominent amongst the artworks Picardo designed for his own building were the large bronze double doors in the south façade leading to the garden. The garden itself, of 1,700 square metres and also designed by Picardo, was intended from the original concept to be a notable part of the project.

The building was inaugurated in January 1975 to acclaim. One observer has noted that in producing the building Picardo had been "controlling proportions and spaces with complete ease and achieving one of the best buildings in the recent history of Madrid". Picardo himself described it as his best work.

== Real Escuela Andaluza del Arte Equestre ==
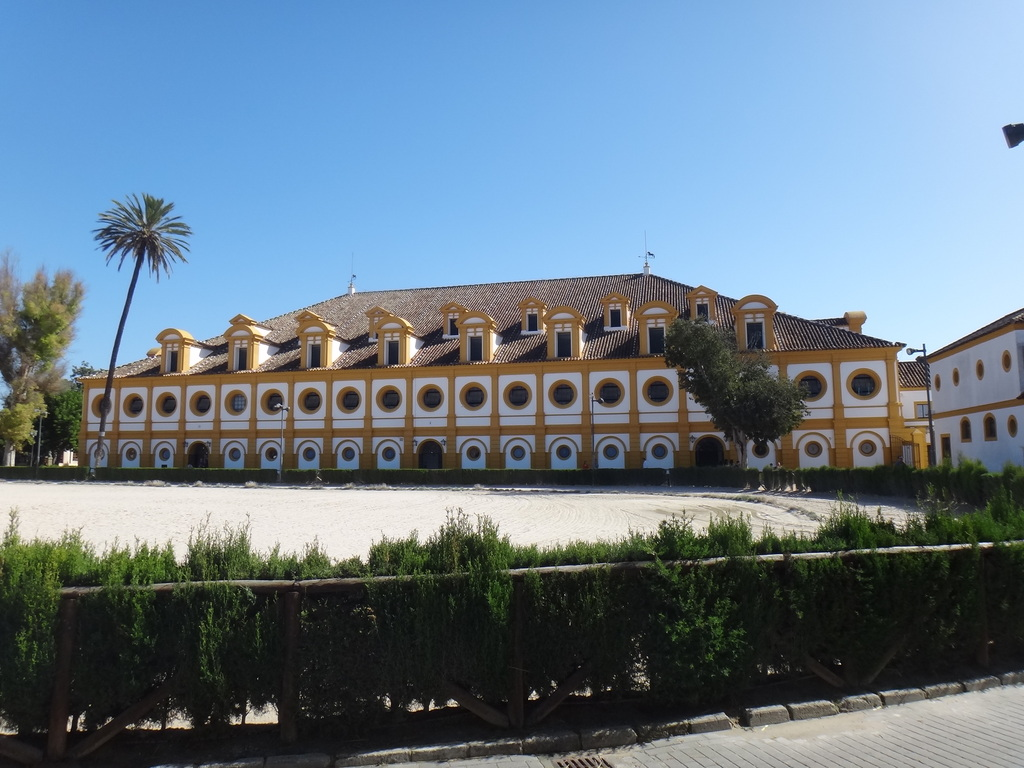
José Luis Picardo's Sala de Equitación at the Real Escuela Andaluza del Arte Equestre, Jerez.

In 1978 Picardo was commissioned by the Ministry of Information and Tourism to build a public indoor riding arena for the Real Escuela Andaluza del Arte Equestre (Royal Andalucían School of Equestrian Art) in Jerez de la Frontera, his birthplace. The school was established in 1973, dedicated to preserving the heritage of the Pura Raza Española (Pure Bred Spanish horse). It had few decent facilities until the interest and involvement in its activities of Prince Juan Carlos (later the King of Spain) and the Ministry's subsequent decision to take charge of the school.

Picardo's commission from the Ministry was to design a sala de equitación, a huge arena for horse and riding displays, in particular the school's signature performance "Como Bailan los Caballos Andaluces" ("How the Andalusian Horses Dance") which would seat up to 1,600 spectators. Connected to it were to be stable facilities for 60 horses.

Picardo utilised a neo-Renaissance style which in its colouring referred to Andalucía. Externally most of the structure was coloured in a deep ochre, representative of the land and soil of the region while the infilling of the façades copied the stark white of traditional Andalucían village homes.

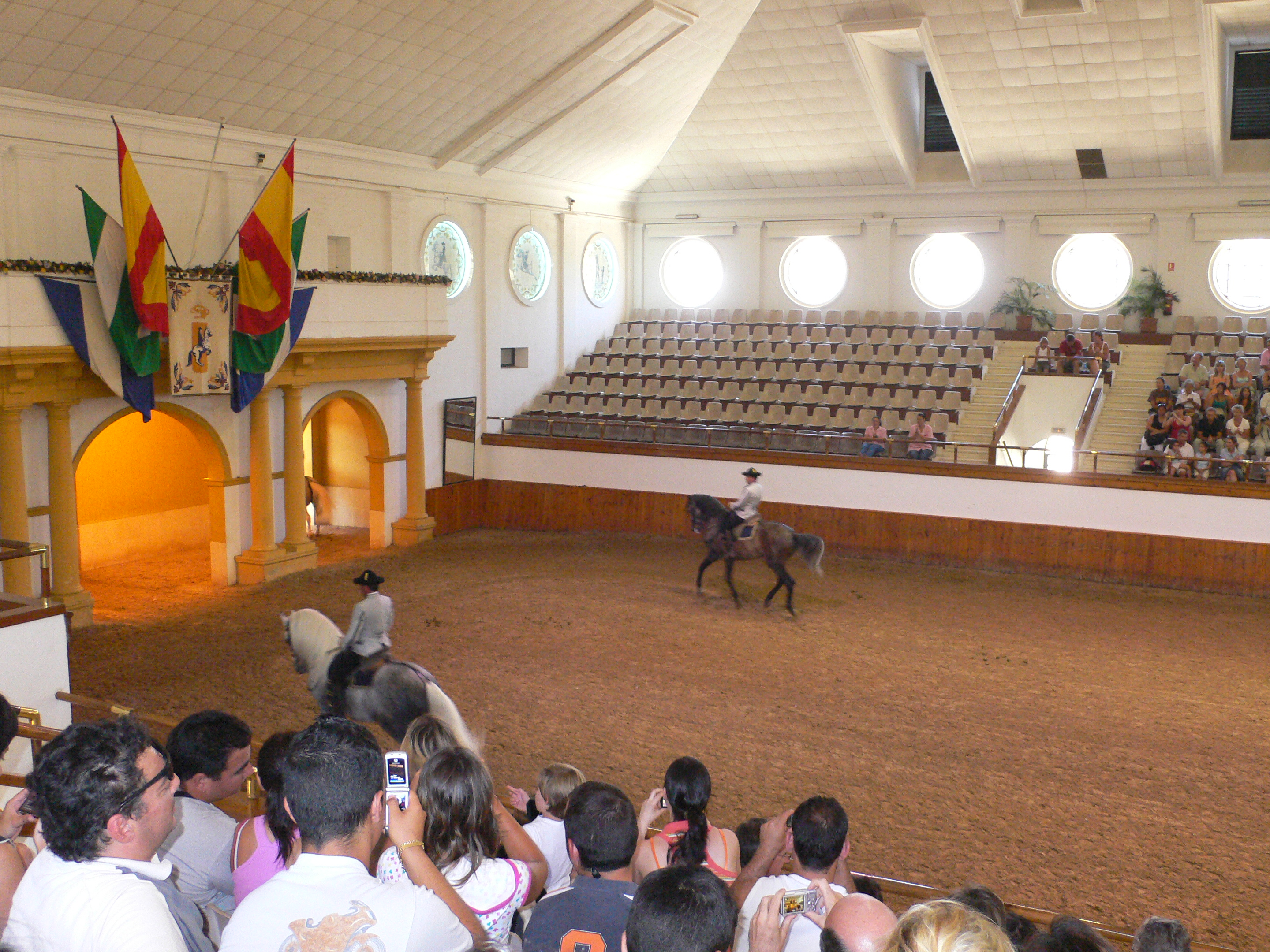
The Grand Entrance of the Sala de Equitación

Rows of relief pillars were the perceived support for the immense crowning hip roof, with between them 54 large circular windows in a single row around the building. Above them, in the roof, Picardo positioned 36 dormer windows serving as ventilation. At ground level was another row of circular windows each placed within its own semi-circular arch and pseudo-supporting pillars.

Internally, the display area is rectangular with spectator seating on six tiers around the arena. Picardo repeated the external colouring inside the hall, with the ochre of the loose sand on which the horses perform, and bright white walls and pitched ceiling reflecting daylight from the many windows. At one end of the arena is the royal box and at the other the grand entrance, beneath flags, which leads to the stables and a central octagonal two-level tack room. Five stable blocks radiate out from the tack room, each with twelve boxes. Within the stables, Picardo repeated his images from the outside, with rows of semi-circular arches topping simple stone pillars.

The Sala de Equitación was opened for performances in 1980.

== Guernica in the Museo Nacional del Prado ==
When Pablo Picasso's large 1937 anti-war painting Guernica was brought to Spain in 1981 from its then home in the Museum of Modern Art in New York, it was decided to hang it permanently in the Museo Nacional del Prado in Madrid, as Picasso had requested. Picardo and fellow architect José María García de Paredes, jointly heading a technical team, were commissioned to design a means of displaying the painting securely in the Salón de Luca Giordano in the Museum's annexe, the Casón del Buen Retiro.

The painting had to be protected by armoured glass from bombs, bullets, and vandalism. The architects' problem was that, while the painting is 7.76 metres long by 3.49 metres high, the largest sheet of 18mm triple armoured glass available at that time was smaller, at 7.50 metres by 2.45 metres. The decision was therefore made to install the painting some distance away from the main sheet of glass, so that the metal frame of the glass would not infringe on the view of the image. The solution for the display was to build an armoured glass and steel polyhedron case whose bevels, for full security, would meet the floor, the walls and the ceiling around the picture. The main glass itself was set at 10 degrees to the vertical to avoid reflections. The sources of illumination would be within the case. The size of the room in which the picture was displayed — a large high space originally created as a ballroom — allowed the whole canvas to be viewed from 25 metres away.

Guernica was installed in September 1981 and the room opened to the public on 25 October that year, Picasso's centenary. Within a year, over one million people had seen Guernica in its new Picardo/de Paredes setting. Opinions of the method of display differed. The artist's daughter, Paloma Picasso, applauded the location and the method of display, as did Spanish artist Josep Renau. Catalan architect, Josep Lluís Sert, described it as "magnificent". The British art critic and collector, Douglas Cooper, wrote that the painting was "admirably lit, there being no shadows, no reflections and no distortions." He went on: "Never in its history has Guernica been displayed so beautifully or so entirely to its advantage." Others were not so convinced. It was reported that the fact the installation was built by the technicians of the Círculo de Bellas Artes rather than by the Prado's own staff brought practical difficulties. And British art critic, David Sylvester, maintained years later that when Guernica was returned to Spain in 1981 "it was hung in an annexe to the Prado, where by common consent it was not seen to advantage."

In 1992 Guernica was controversially moved from the Museo Nacional del Prado (where Picasso had wanted the painting to be permanently displayed) to a purpose-built gallery at the Museo Nacional Centro de Arte Reina Sofía. The Picardo/García de Paredes display installation is no longer in use.

== Two Provincial Historical Archives in Spain ==
=== Archivo Histórico Provincial de Ciudad Real, Castilla-La Mancha ===
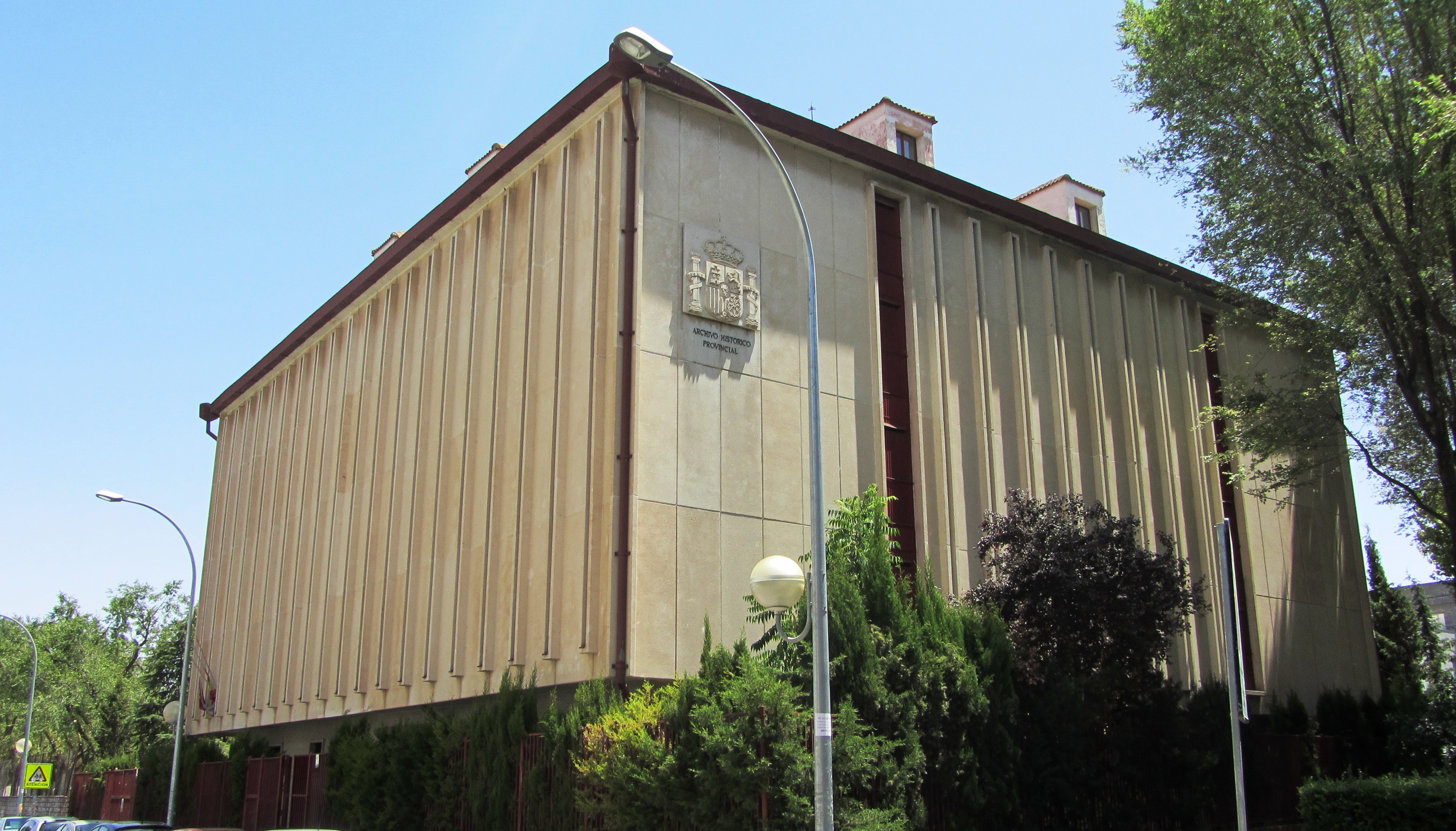
Archivo Histórico Provincial de Ciudad Real, viewed from Ronda de Calatrava, 2012.

In 1985 Picardo was invited to design a building specifically to house the Archivo Histórico Provincial de Ciudad Real (Provincial Historical Archive of Ciudad Real). Since 1934 the steadily growing collection had suffered a somewhat peripatetic existence, being moved from building to building. Picardo was brought in by the Junta de Comunidades (Community Board) of Castilla La Mancha to design a "modern and functional" permanent home for the archives near the university campus in the city of Ciudad Real.

On a site on the corner of the Calle Echegaray and Ronda de Calatrava Picardo built a rectilinear cream-coloured functional box of some six stories. Viewed in plan it is exactly square. Its smooth walls carry a mass of narrow slit windows rising vertically and uninterrupted from the second to the fifth floors. The building is enlivened by red rainwater goods and fire escapes. It is topped by a pyramidal roof punctuated with eight regularly-spaced, small dormer windows. The name of the institution and the Spanish coat of arms in relief high on the wall facing Ronda de Calatrava dignify the building.

Inside, on the main floor, somewhat smaller than the floors above it, there is a "large and comfortable" research room, the secretariat and other offices. There is also space for exhibitions and an assembly hall. The four huge storage floors above, protected from damaging daylight by the slit windows, have a capacity of more than 12,000 linear metres of documents. The new building opened to the public in 1989.

=== Archivo Histórico Provincial de Salamanca, Castilla y Léon ===
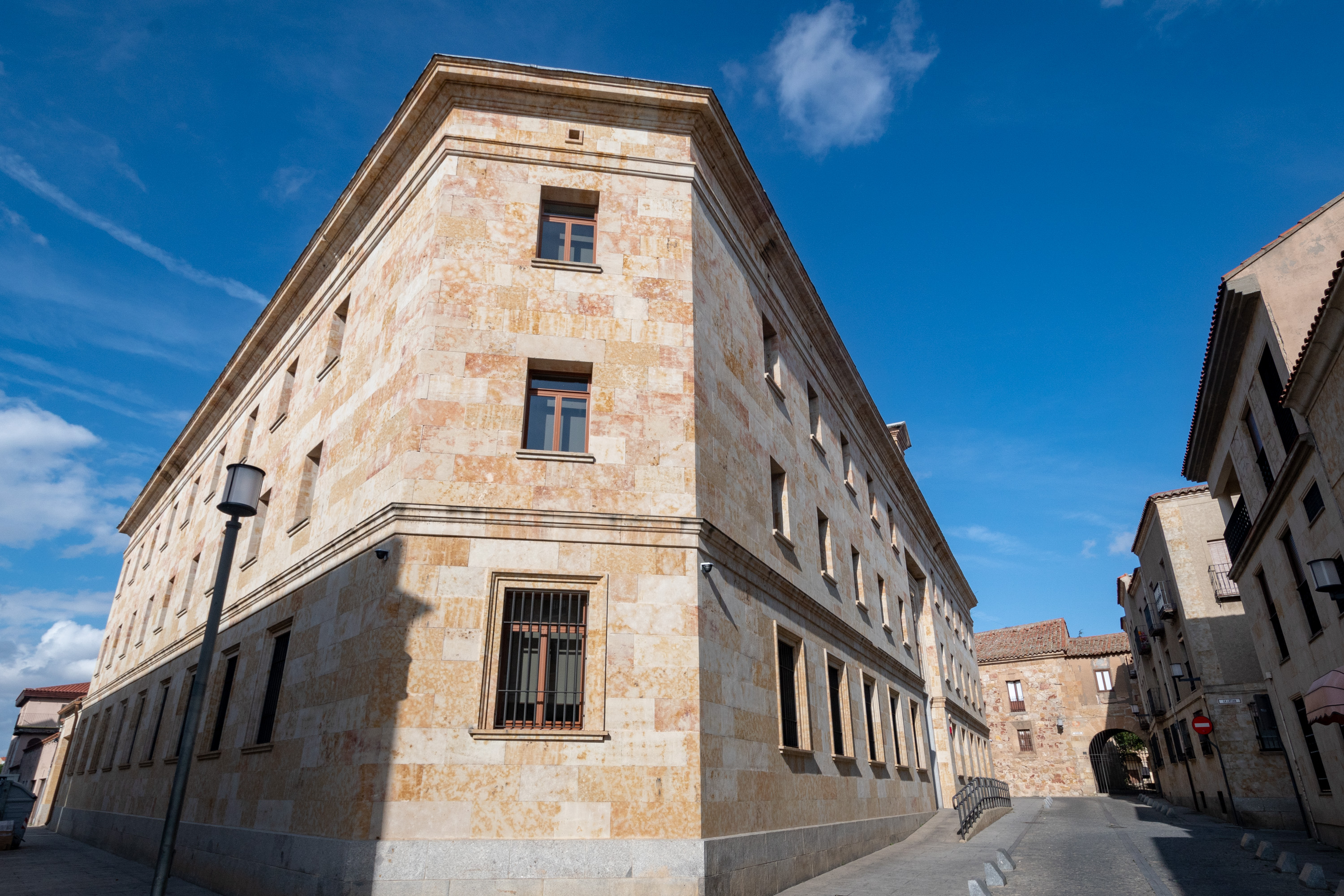
Archivo Histórico Provincial de Salamanca, Calle Trilinque to the left, Calle Las Mazas ahead, 2018.

Picardo's last architectural project was started in 1992 and completed in 1995. The Archivo Histórico Provincial de Salamanca suffered a nomadic and precarious existence from its first formal establishment in 1931, moving from building to building, and occasionally being split into various locations. In 1982 the Ministry of Culture resolved to establish a purpose-built home for the archive, but it was not until ten years later, in 1992, that Picardo began work on a site on the Calle Las Mazas on the edge of the remains of the Convent de San Agustín in the old centre of Salamanca.

The result is a building with façades on three streets: Calle Las Mazas, Calle Trilingue, and Calle La Plata. It is clad overall with Villamayor stone, a locally quarried sandstone that provides the ocherous colour on the façades of many of the old buildings in the City of Salamanca. Identical, modestly sized windows, placed regularly, delineate each of the three main floors. On each floor the iteration of the windows is identical to the floor below. There are ten window verticalities on the central Las Mazas façade, nine on that around the corner facing Calle Trilique, sixteen around the other corner on Calle La Plata, with one on each of the two chamfers at each end of the central façade. Occasional irregularities occur, most notably at the main entrance of the building, placed centrally on the east-south-east Las Mazas façade to look directly down Calle Latina and Calle Tavira towards the west face of the cathedral cloister.

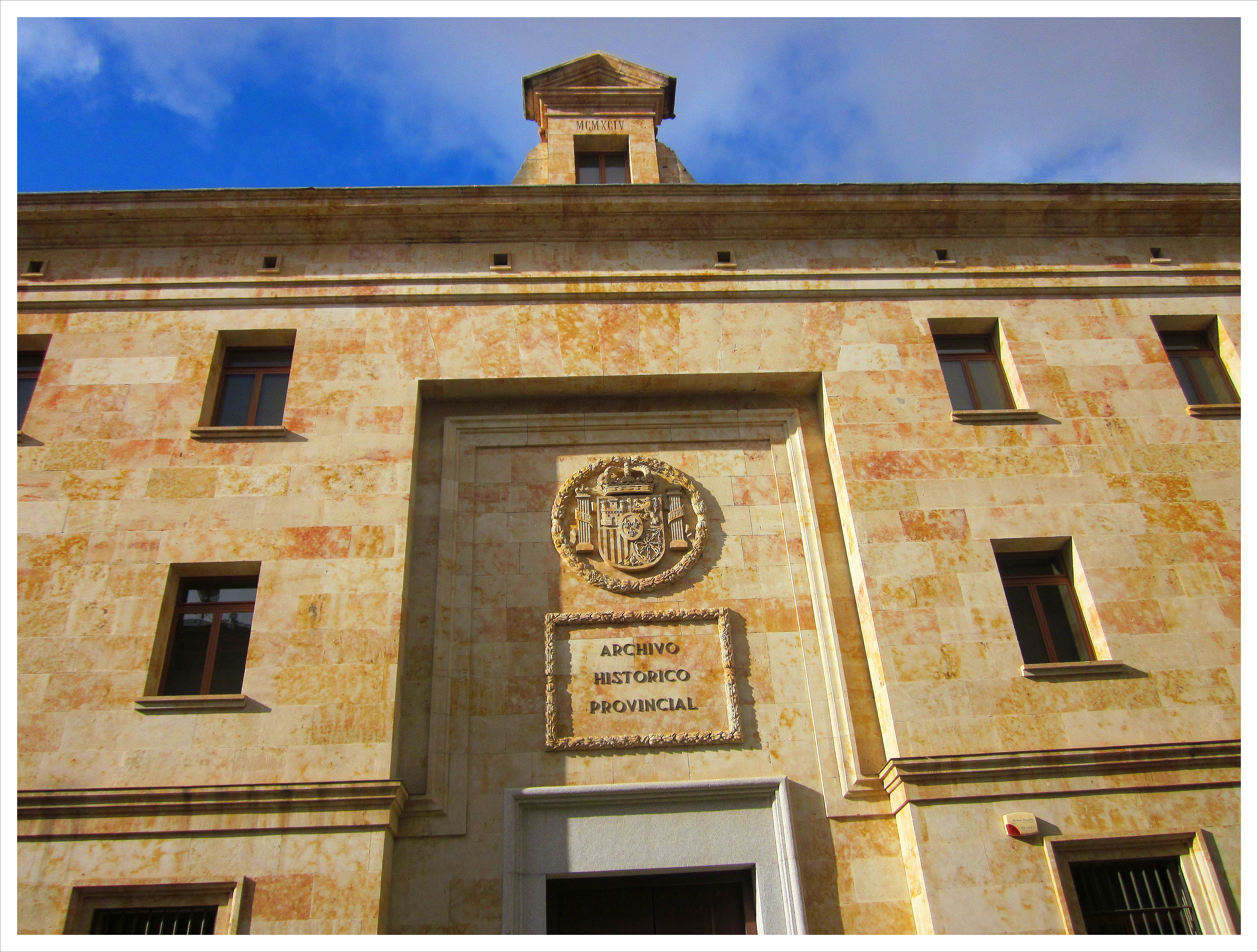
The main entrance on Calle Las Mazas to the Archivo Histórico Provincial de Salamanca, 2012.

Picardo placed the Archive's entrance within a double height inset where the simple stone string course set above the ground floor windows turns inwards to the inset and then rises above the door to outline the building's name topped with the coat of arms of Spain, carved in heavy relief. Directly above the entrance and beyond the cornice, Picardo has placed an unexpected single dormer window crowned with an oversized triangular classical pediment and adorned with the date in Roman numerals of the building's completion. The whole building has a simple muted aspect, not outshining or overwhelming its neighbours and belies its substantial internal floor area.

Picardo gave the building five floors, though this is not apparent from the exterior. Inside it is bright, modern and utilitarian. On the ground floor is an exhibition hall, a conference room, the document unloading dock, meeting rooms, and the researchers' room which has a capacity for 24 people. On the floors above, including one within the large roof area, are other work stations, including facilities for reproduction and restoration, administrative offices and, most significantly, the archive storage facilities themselves. Mobile shelving provides document storage of 22,250 linear metres.

== Election to the Real Academia ==
On 3 February 1997, at the age of 78, Picardo was elected Academician of the Real Academia de Bellas Artes de San Fernando (Royal Academy of Fine Arts of San Fernando), being proposed by Julio Cano Lasso, Fernando Chueca Goitia and Luis García-Ochoa Ibáñez. He entered the Academy on 22 February 1998 with a speech entitled Hipólito, the composition and delivering of an address having been established as one of the requirements after being elected Academician. In it he talked of two of his passions: architecture and the horse. "The horse is an animal that surpasses the human body in beauty, strength and speed," Picardo claimed. "... and architecture, in turn, is the art that protects this human body and enables and exalts it." He confessed that it was impossible for him to decide between architectural beauty and equine beauty because both "son perfecciones" (are perfections).

In 2000 Picardo gifted the academy his oil painting Guardia civil en el puerto de Alazores, an image of five policemen mounted on five horses in a compact group. The academy observes the complicated juego (game) of the twenty horses' legs of different colours and in different positions seemingly almost entwined.

The academy also houses in its collection a portrait of Picardo by Luis García-Ochoa Ibáñez. Painted in 1953 it portrays Picardo in an informal pose at the age of 34. It was donated to the academy by his sons in 2023.

== Premio Antonio Camuñas de Arquitectura ==
In 2001 Picardo won the prestigious Antonio Camuñas Prize for Architecture. The prize has been awarded every two years since 1985. Its purpose is to recognise the oeuvre of a Spanish architect who has stood out in his or her work for architectural renovation. The prize jury praised Picardo, the ninth winner, as an architect "knowledgeable about our culture ... who has quietly exercised his professional activity, reinterpreting and valuing the richness of our historical heritage."

== Personal life ==
Picardo married Trinidad de Ribera Talavera and they had five children: three boys and two girls.

In a rare public description of Picardo's personality a US travel journalist wrote of him in 1972 as "a package of energy, wit and imagination ... eyes twinkling".

Picardo died on 27 July 2010 in Madrid.
