= Castle of Zafra =

Castle of Zafra may refer to:

- Castle of Zafra (Badajoz), a 15th-century castle in Zafra, Badajoz, Spain
- Castle of Zafra (Guadalajara), a 12th-century castle in Campillo de Dueñas, Guadalajara, Spain
