= Castle of the Bishops of Sigüenza =

Building in the Province of Guadalajara, Spain

Coordinates: 41°03′51″N 02°38′29″W

- Castillo de los Obispos de Sigüenza
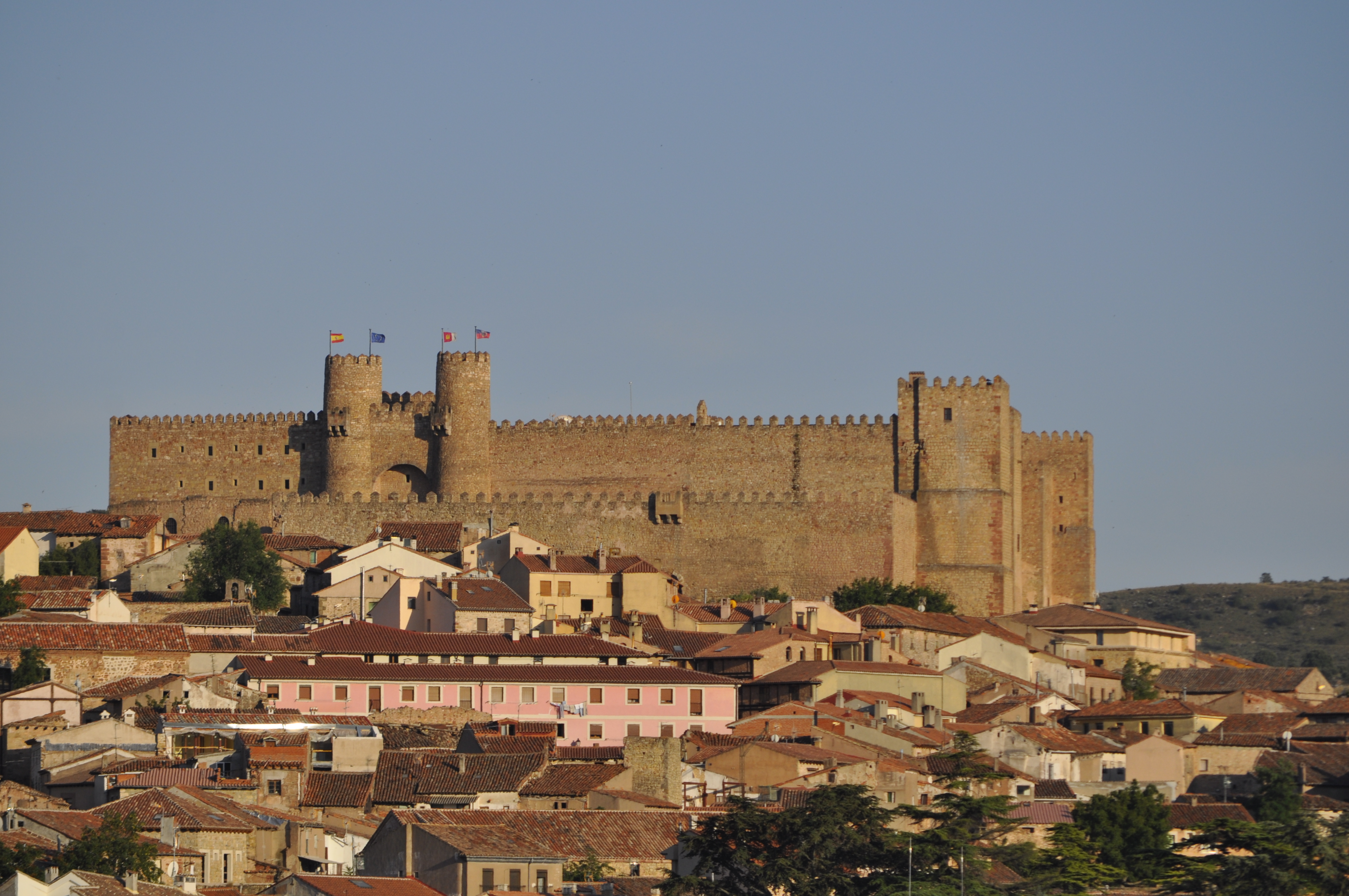
- Alternative names: Parador de Sigüenza
- Hotel chain: Paradores

General information
- Location: Sigüenza (Guadalajara), Spain

Website
- Parador de Sigüenza

The Castle of the Bishops of Sigüenza (Castillo de los Obispos de Sigüenza) is located in Sigüenza in the Province of Guadalajara in central Spain. With foundations dating back to the 5th century, it was extended by the Moors and retaken for the Christians by Bernard of Agen in 1123.

== History ==
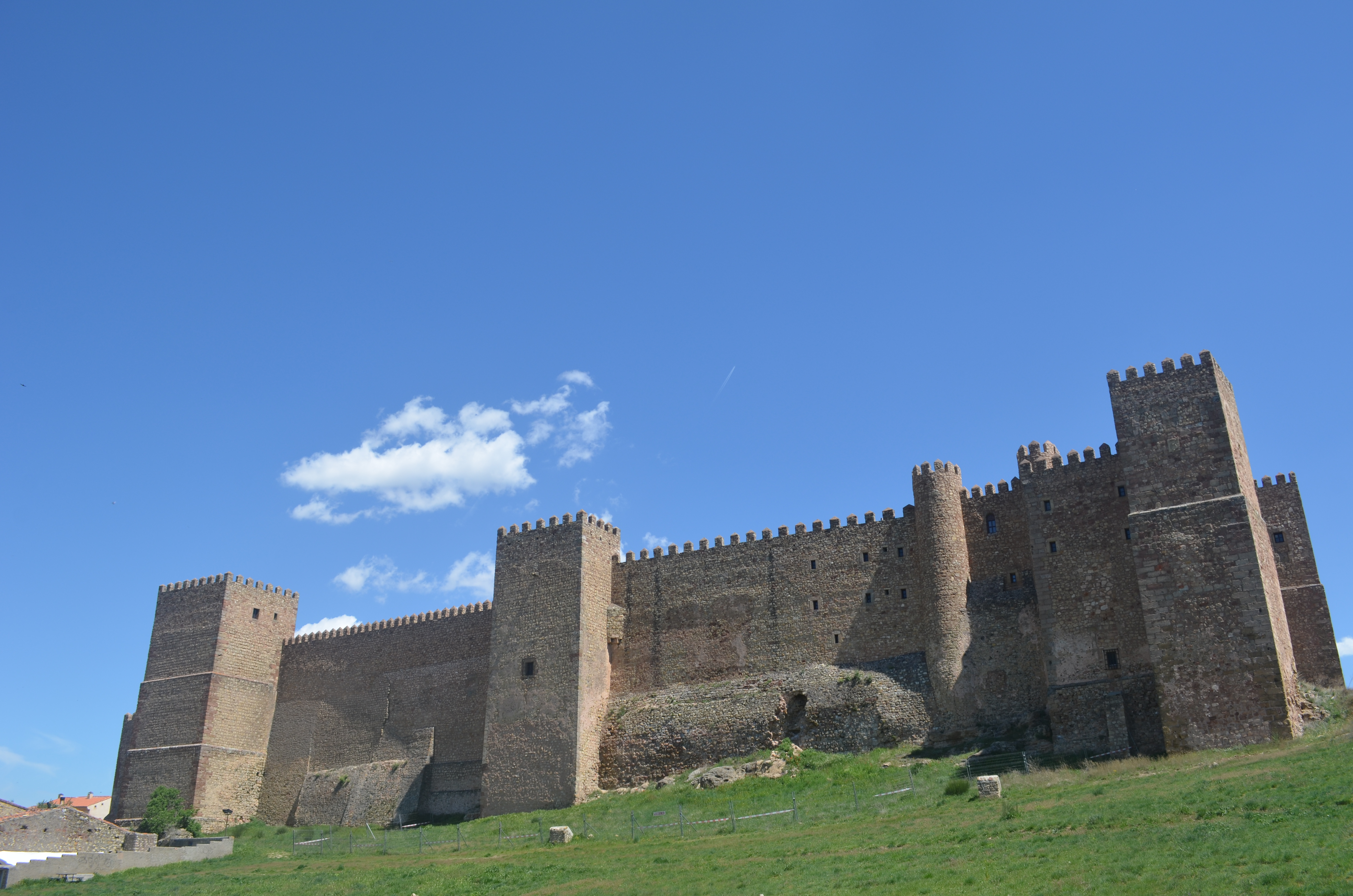
Castle

The origins of the fortifications in Sigüenza go back to the Celtiberians who inhabited the right bank of the river in the final centuries B.C. The Visigoths built a small castle in the 5th century above the town. The Moors built a large fortified castle or alcazaba in the early 8th century to defend the area against the Christian kings of Leon and Castile. It was enclosed by a defensive wall providing an area known as the medina. In 1124, the castle was retaken by Bernard of Agen allowing Simón Girón de Cisneros to build an episcopal palace there. In 1298, the castle was taken by the troops of Alfonso de la Cerda during the battle against Ferdinand IV of Castile, the boy king, but was defended by the bishop's vassals. In the 15th century, the castle was strengthened by the bishops to protect it from attacks from Aragon and Navarre.

In the late 18th century, Bishop Juan Díaz de la Guerra changed the appearance of the castle from a fortress into an episcopal palace with additional windows, balconies and stables. However, in 1808 during the War of Spanish Independence the castle was taken by the French who seriously damaged it and looted all its riches before it was recaptured by El Empecinado. The episcopal palace was further devastated by fire in the 1830s and had to be abandoned.

== Parador ==
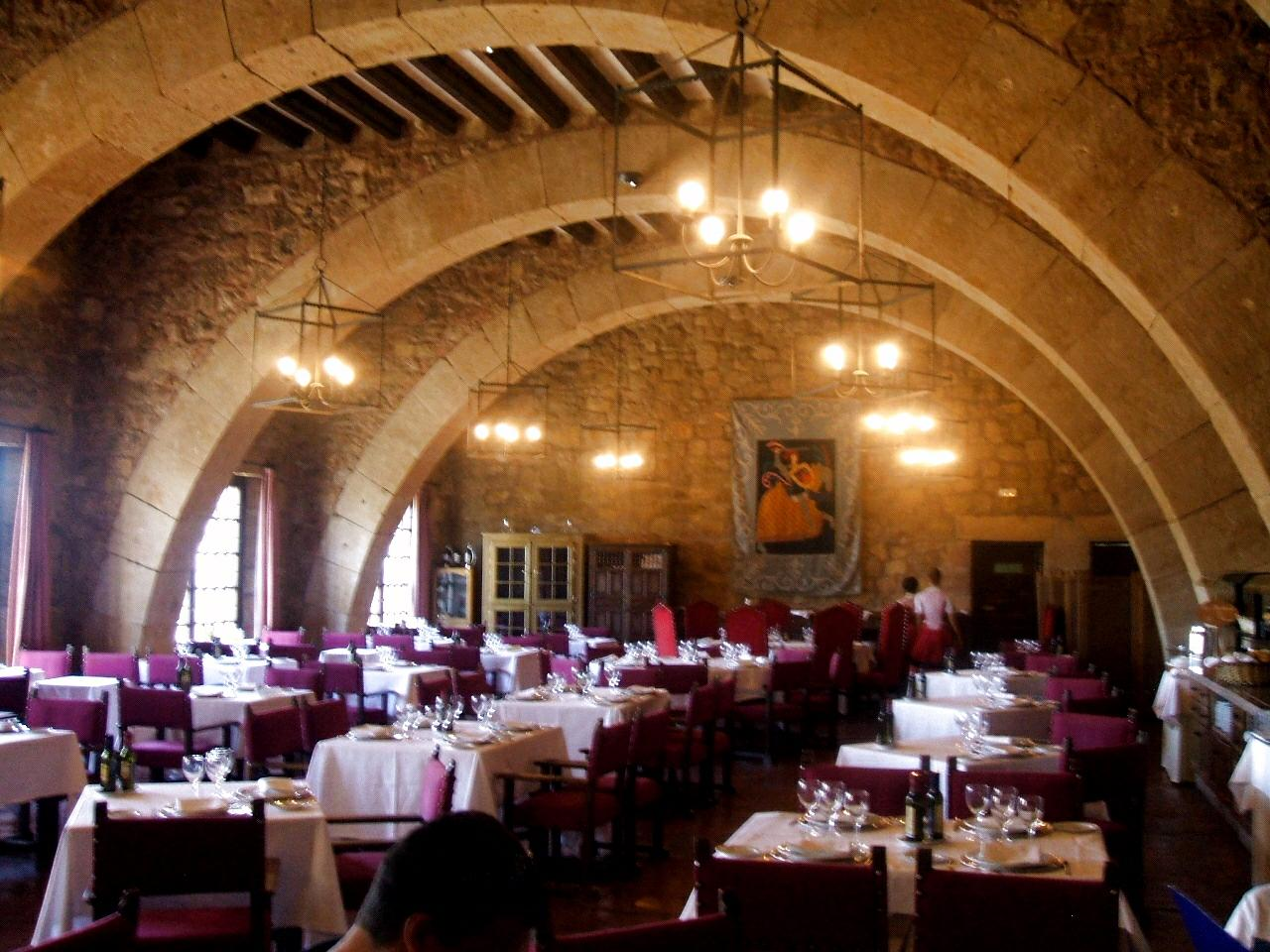
Parador dining room

In 1972, the Ministry of Tourism gave the castle the status of a parador or luxury hotel. Restoration of the building began in 1964 and was completed in 1976 by the architect José Luis Picardo. The official inauguration took place in 1978 with the visit of King King Juan Carlos and Queen Sofía. Decorated with banners and suits of armour, the huge lounge is the castle's original dining room.
