= Paradores =

Spanish hotel chain

Paradores de Turismo de España
- Trade name: Paradores
- Type: Sociedad Anónima
- Industry: Hospitality, Hotels
- Founded: 8 October 1928; 97 years ago
- Founder: Government of Spain
- Headquarters: Madrid, Spain
- Number of locations: 100 paradors (2026)
- Key people: Raquel Sánchez (President)
- Revenue: ▼€335 million (2025)
- Net income: ▼€23.5 million (2025)
- Total assets: ▲€563.3 million (2025)
- Owner: Ministry of Finance
- Number of employees: 5,261 (2025)
- Website: www.parador.es/en

Paradores de Turismo de España S.M.E. S.A., branded as Paradores, is a Spanish state-owned chain of luxury hotels that are usually located in historic buildings or in nature areas with a special appeal. Its first parador was inaugurated on 9 October 1928 in Navarredonda de Gredos (Ávila). As of 2026, it operates ninety-nine paradores in Spain and one in Portugal, with 6,051 rooms in total. Every parador has its own restaurant offering the regional gastronomy of its area. (Note: Except for the Parador of Hondarribia.)

The company was created with the double objective of promoting tourism in areas that lacked adequate accommodations, and of putting unused large historic buildings to use, for the maintenance of the national heritage. Along its history, the establishments of its network have been branded as Parador, Parador Nacional, Parador de Turismo or Parador Nacional de Turismo in different times.

A Portuguese equivalent, Pousadas de Portugal, were founded on 1 May 1941, following the Spanish model.

== History ==
In 1910, the Council of Ministers chaired by prime minister José Canalejas commissioned Benigno de la Vega-Inclán, marquess de la Vega-Inclán, to create a hotel structure, which did not exist at the time, in whose establishments hikers and travelers would be accommodated, while at the same time improving Spain's international image. In 1911, the Royal Tourism Commission was created chaired by the marquess himself.

It was in August 1926 when the Royal Tourism Commission began the construction of the first establishment at a location in a nature area of the Sierra de Gredos chosen by King Alfonso XIII himself. On 25 April 1928, the new Patronato Nacional de Turismo (National Tourist Board) assumed the functions of the Royal Commission. Finally, after some time in operation, the Parador Nacional de Gredos, the first parador of the network, was inaugurated by the King on 9 October 1928 in Navarredonda de Gredos (Ávila).

Following the successful opening, the Junta de Paradores y Hosterías del Reino was established in 1929, with the double objective of promoting tourism in areas that lacked adequate accommodations, but with conditions to attract nature or heritage tourism, and of putting unused large historic buildings to use, for the maintenance of the national heritage. The Parador de Oropesa, opened on 7 February 1930, and inaugurated on 11 March, in the Medieval castle of Oropesa (Toledo), was the first located in a historic building. In May 1930, the Hostería de la Rábida in Palos de la Frontera (Huelva) and Hostería del Estudiante in Alcalá de Henares (Madrid) were the first hosterías opened. (Note: Hosterías are restaurants without lodging.) Over the years, the paradors spread throughout the national territory and the hosterías were converted into paradors.

At the same time, the Patronato Nacional de Turismo began the construction of the new Albergues de Carretera. These roadside hostels with repair shop and gas pump were located in rest areas at key points on the road network and were built following a design by architects Carlos Arniches Moltó and Martín Domínguez Esteban in International Style. On 12 March 1931, the first Albergue de Carretera was inaugurated in Manzanares (Ciudad Real). Of the seventeen initially planned Albergues, only twelve were built, and over time, many of them ended up being converted into paradors and the rest closing down.

The Spanish Civil War (1936-1939) was a halt for tourism. Some of the paradors were damaged or used as hospitals during the war. Once the conflict was over, the restoration and reopening of the existing establishments was encouraged. The greatest expansion process took place in the 1960s, coinciding with the important tourist development experienced by the country. In those years the Paradores Nacionales de Turismo network went from 40 to 83 establishments.

During the 1980s, the company underwent a wide restructuring and reorganization, shutting down some obsolete facilities, and operating criteria were revised to improve profitability. In 1986, some establishments belonging to the Empresa Nacional de Turismo (Entursa), such as luxury Hostal de los Reyes Catolicos and Hostal de San Marcos, were transferred to it.

== Company ==
Since 18 January 1991, Paradores de Turismo de España has been a State Mercantile Sociedad Anónima fully owned by the Directorate-General for State Heritage (DGPE), a state patrimonial agency dependent on the Ministry of Finance of the Government of Spain. The company is the concessionaire of the use and occupancy of the buildings and facilities owned by the Spanish State through the Instituto de Turismo de España (Turespaña), the government agency that, dependent on the Ministry of Industry, is responsible of setting the company's strategy and planning, monitoring its effectiveness and building new facilities. The company's mission is to promote sustainable, accessible and quality tourism, as well as the maintenance of the buildings it operates, many of them monuments of high historical-artistic value declared Bien de Interés Cultural.

According to Brand Finance, Paradores was the brand with the highest reputation in Spain in 2019–20 and the second in 2021. It was also the world's leading hotel company in reputation in 2019–21, and the only Spanish company in the global top 10.

== Network ==
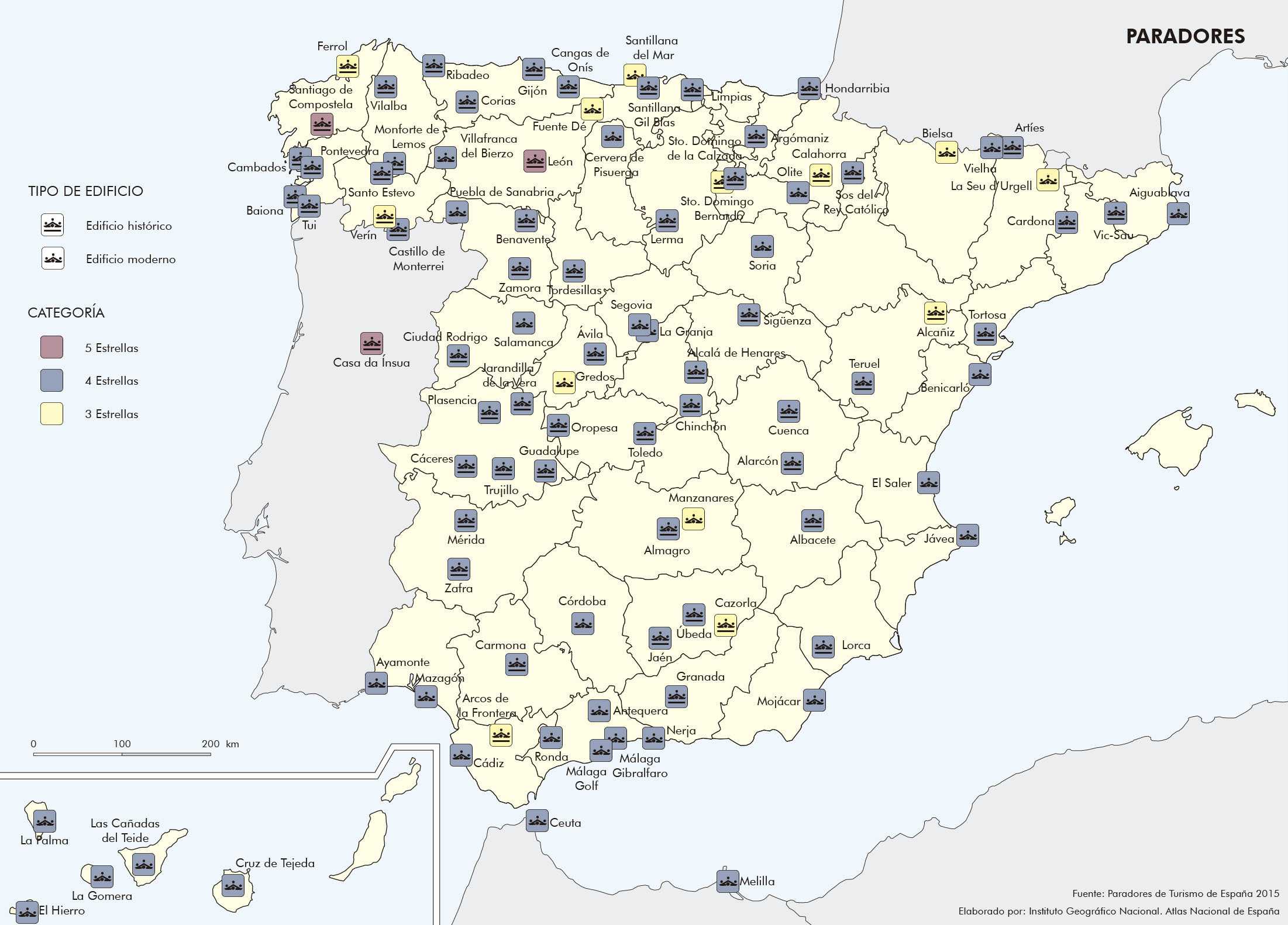
Paradores' network in 2015

As of 2026, Paradores operates a hotel network of ninety-nine state-owned establishments in Spain and one franchised establishment in Portugal, with 6,051 rooms in total. Paradors are located all around Spain, and have a presence in all its provinces except for Biscay. The provinces with the most paradors are Cáceres and Málaga, with five each. In addition to the paradors located in castles, palaces, fortresses, convents, monasteries and other historic buildings, there are also other located in modern buildings in nature areas with a special appeal and/or with panoramic views of historical and monumental cities. The paradors are divided in Esentia - monumental and historic hotels, Civia - urban hotels, and Naturia - hotels close to the coast and nature. Prices vary according to category, room, region and season.

One of the oldest continuously operating hotels in the world, the Hostal de los Reyes Catolicos in Santiago de Compostela (A Coruña), founded in 1499 by the Catholic Monarchs as a hostelry and hospital for pilgrims at the very end of the Way of St James, and transferred to the network on 24 February 1986, is the finest parador, and with its 137 rooms for 262 guests is also the largest by capacity. The Parador de El Saler and its golf course in Valencia, occupying 71.2889 hectares (176.159 acres) of land, is the largest by area. The Parador Castillo de Monterrei in Monterrei (Ourense) with 12 rooms for 24 guests, and occupying 994 square metres (10,700 sq ft) of land, is the smallest. The Parador de Las Cañadas del Teide in La Orotava (Santa Cruz de Tenerife), located at 2,146 metres (7,041 ft) above sea level, is the highest. The Parador in Ibiza (Balearic Islands), opened on 10 March 2026, is the newest.

Turespaña is building new paradors in Morella (Castellón) and Vera de Moncayo (Zaragoza). Paradores will furnish, operate and maintain them once completed.

=== List of paradors ===
Ninety-nine paradors are located in Spain (listed below) and one, Parador Casa da Ínsua, in Penalva do Castelo, Portugal.

- Aiguablava, Naturia (Aiguablava, Girona)
- Alarcón, Castle of Alarcón, Esentia (Cuenca)
- Albacete, Civia (Albacete)
- Alcalá de Henares, Civia (Madrid)
- Alcañiz, Castle of the Calatravos, Esentia (Teruel)
- Almagro, Convento de Santa Catalina de Siena, Esentia (Ciudad Real)
- Antequera, Civia (Málaga)
- Arcos de la Frontera, Esentia (Cádiz) (Note: The Parador of Arcos de la Frontera is housed in the Casa del Corregidor, the old mayor's house, since shortly after the village was declared Conjunto histórico. The Parador is a reflection of local architecture, where a three-storey façade with neoclassical composition gives way to a small entrance hall leading to a traditional Andalusian patio.)
- Argómaniz, Civia (Álava)
- Artíes, Naturia (Lleida)
- Ávila, Esentia (Ávila)
- Ayamonte, Naturia (Huelva)
- Baiona, Esentia (Pontevedra)
- Benavente, Civia (Zamora)
- Benicarló, Naturia (Castellón)
- Bielsa, Naturia, Tena Valley (Huesca)
- Cáceres, Palacio del Comendador de Alcuéscar y Casa de los Ovando Perero, Esentia (Cáceres)
- Cádiz, Civia (Cádiz) (Note: The first Parador of Cadiz was called Gran Hotel Atlántico. It was built in the Genovés park (Parque Genovés, on the N-E side of the present parador), where the Bosque used to stand; it was inaugurated in november 1929. Not to be confused with an inn in Madrid called Parador de Cádiz, at number 125, Calle Toledo, where the road going to Andalusia started.)
- Calahorra, Civia (La Rioja)
- Cambados, Naturia (Pontevedra)
- Cangas de Onís, Monastery of San Pedro de Villanueva, Naturia (Asturias)
- Cardona, Castle of Cardona, Esentia (Barcelona)
- Carmona, Alcázar del Rey Don Pedro, Esentia (Sevilla)
- Cazorla, Naturia (Jaén)
- Cervera de Pisuerga, Naturia (Palencia)
- Ceuta, Civia (Ceuta)
- Chinchón, Esentia (Madrid)
- Ciudad Rodrigo, Castillo de Enrique II, Esentia (Salamanca)
- Córdoba, Parador de la Arruzafa, Civia (Córdoba), built on the remnants of Abd-al-Rahman I's summer palace
- Corias, Abbey of San Juan Bautista de Corias, Esentia (Asturias)
- Cruz de Tejeda, Naturia (Las Palmas)
- Cuenca, Convent of San Pablo, Esentia (Cuenca)
- El Hierro, Naturia (Santa Cruz de Tenerife)
- El Saler, Naturia (Valencia)
- Ferrol, Civia (A Coruña)
- Fuente Dé, Naturia (Cantabria)
- Gijón, Civia (Asturias)
- Granada, Palace of the Convent of San Francisco, Esentia (Granada)
- Gredos, Naturia (Ávila)
- Guadalupe, Esentia (Cáceres)
- Hondarribia, Castillo de Carlos V, Esentia (Guipúzcoa)
- Ibiza, Esentia (Balearic Islands)
- Jaén, Castle of Santa Catalina, Esentia (Jaén)
- Jarandilla de la Vera, Castillo Palacio de los Condes de Oropesa, Esentia (Cáceres)
- Jávea, Naturia (Alicante)
- La Gomera, Naturia (Santa Cruz de Tenerife)
- La Granja, Esentia (Segovia)
- La Palma, Naturia (Santa Cruz de Tenerife)
- La Seu d’Urgell, Civia (Lleida)
- Las Cañadas del Teide, Naturia (Santa Cruz de Tenerife)
- León, Convento de San Marcos, Esentia (León)
- Lerma, Ducal Palace of Lerma, Esentia (Burgos)
- Limpias, Naturia (Cantabria)
- Lorca, Castle of Lorca, Esentia (Murcia)
- Málaga Gibralfaro, Civia (Málaga)
- Málaga Golf, Naturia (Málaga)
- Manzanares, Civia (Ciudad Real)
- Mazagón, Naturia (Huelva)
- Melilla, Civia (Melilla)
- Mérida, Convento de Jesús Nazareno, Esentia (Badajoz)
- Mojácar, Naturia (Almería)
- Molina de Aragón, Naturia (Guadalajara)
- Monforte de Lemos, Monastery of San Vicente do Pino, Esentia (Lugo)
- Monterrei, Castle of Monterrey, Esentia (Ourense)
- Nerja, Naturia (Málaga)
- Olite, Palacio de los Teobaldos, Esentia (Navarre)
- Oropesa, Castillo de Oropesa, Esentia (Toledo)
- Plasencia, Convento de Santo Domingo, Esentia (Cáceres)
- Pontevedra, Pazo of the Counts of Maceda, Civia (Pontevedra)
- Puebla de Sanabria, Naturia (Zamora)
- Ribadeo, Naturia (Lugo)
- Ronda, Esentia (Málaga)
- Salamanca, Civia (Salamanca)
- Santiago de Compostela, Hostal dos Reis Católicos, Esentia (A Coruña)
- Santillana del Mar, Esentia (Cantabria)
- Santillana Gil Blas, Esentia (Cantabria)
- Santo Domingo Bernardo de Fresneda, Esentia (La Rioja)
- Santo Domingo de la Calzada, Esentia (La Rioja)
- Santo Estevo, Monasterio de San Esteban, Esentia (Ourense)
- Segovia, Civia (Segovia)
- Sigüenza, Castle of the Bishops of Sigüenza, Esentia (Guadalajara)
- Soria, Civia (Soria)
- Sos del Rey Católico, Esentia (Zaragoza)
- Teruel, Civia (Teruel)
- Toledo, Esentia (Toledo)
- Tordesillas, Civia (Valladolid)
- Tortosa, Esentia (Tarragona)
- Trujillo, Esentia (Cáceres)
- Tui, Civia (Pontevedra)
- Úbeda, Palacio del Deán Ortega, Esentia (Jaén)
- Vic-Sau, Naturia (Barcelona)
- Vielha, Naturia (Lleida)
- Vilalba, Castillo de Andrade, Civia (Lugo)
- Villafranca del Bierzo, Naturia (León)
- Zafra, Castle of Zafra, Esentia (Badajoz)
- Zamora, Palacio de los Condes de Alba y Aliste, Esentia (Zamora)

=== Gallery ===
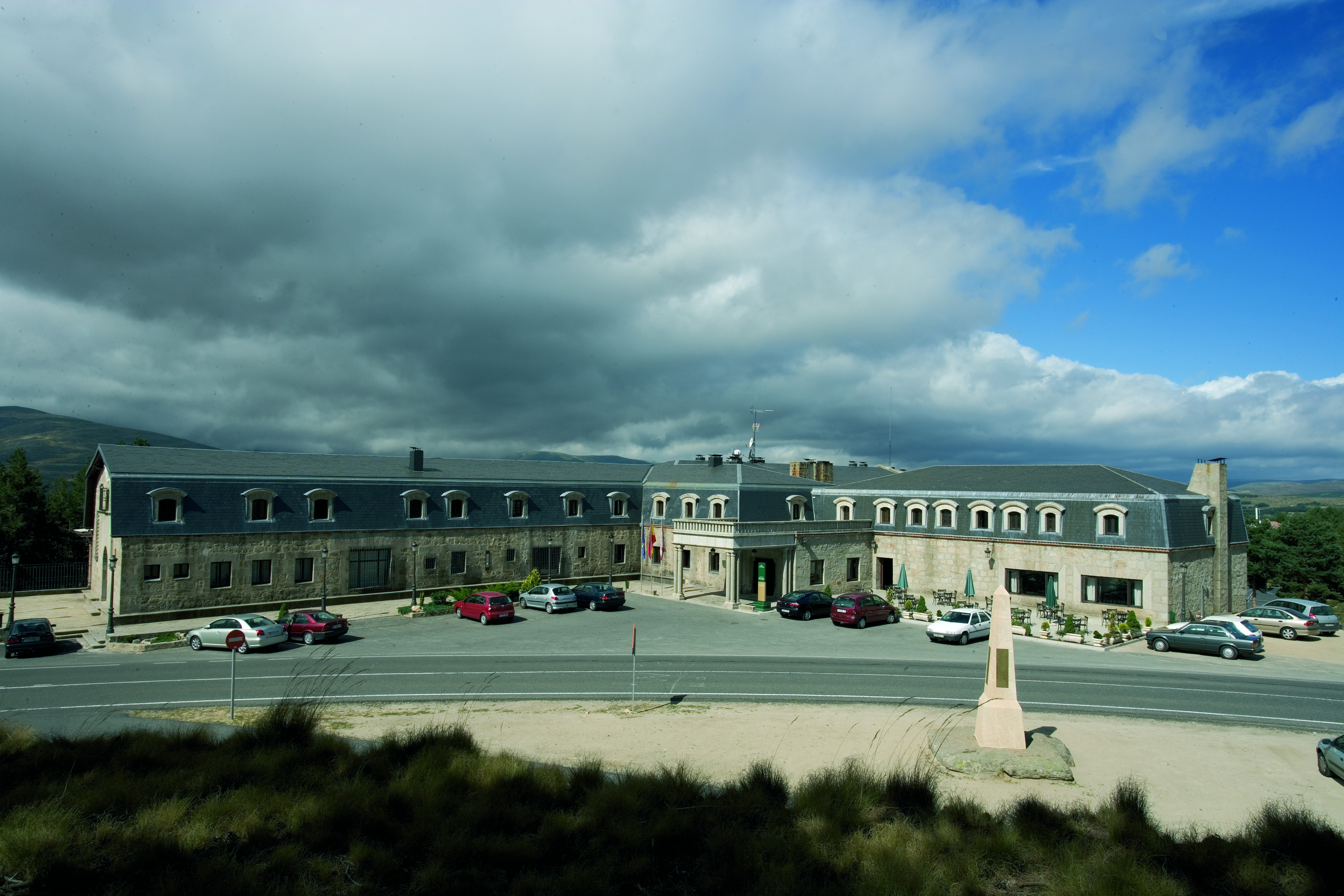
Parador de Gredos, the first parador opened.

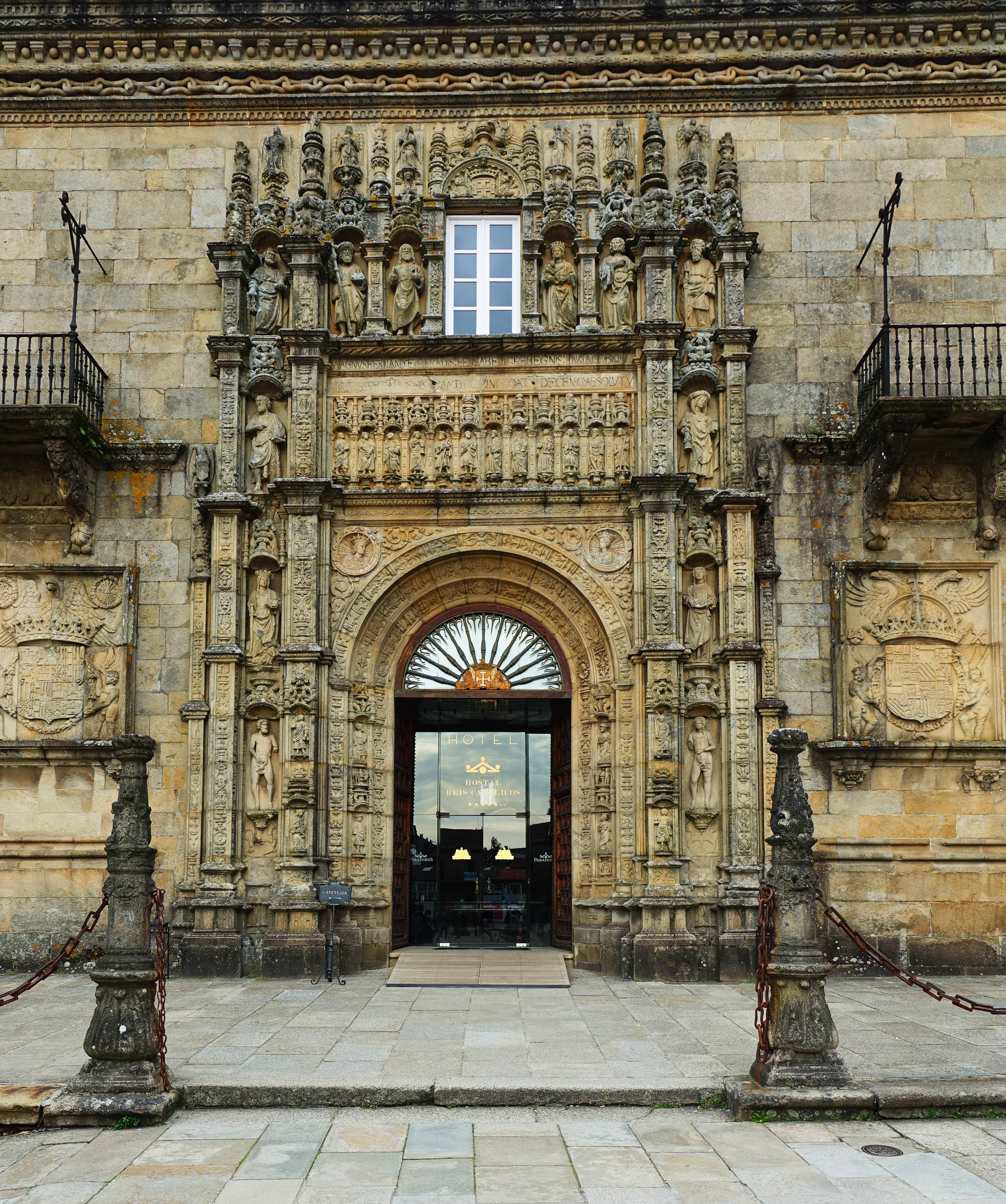
Hostal de los Reyes Católicos 16th Century Plateresque front facade.

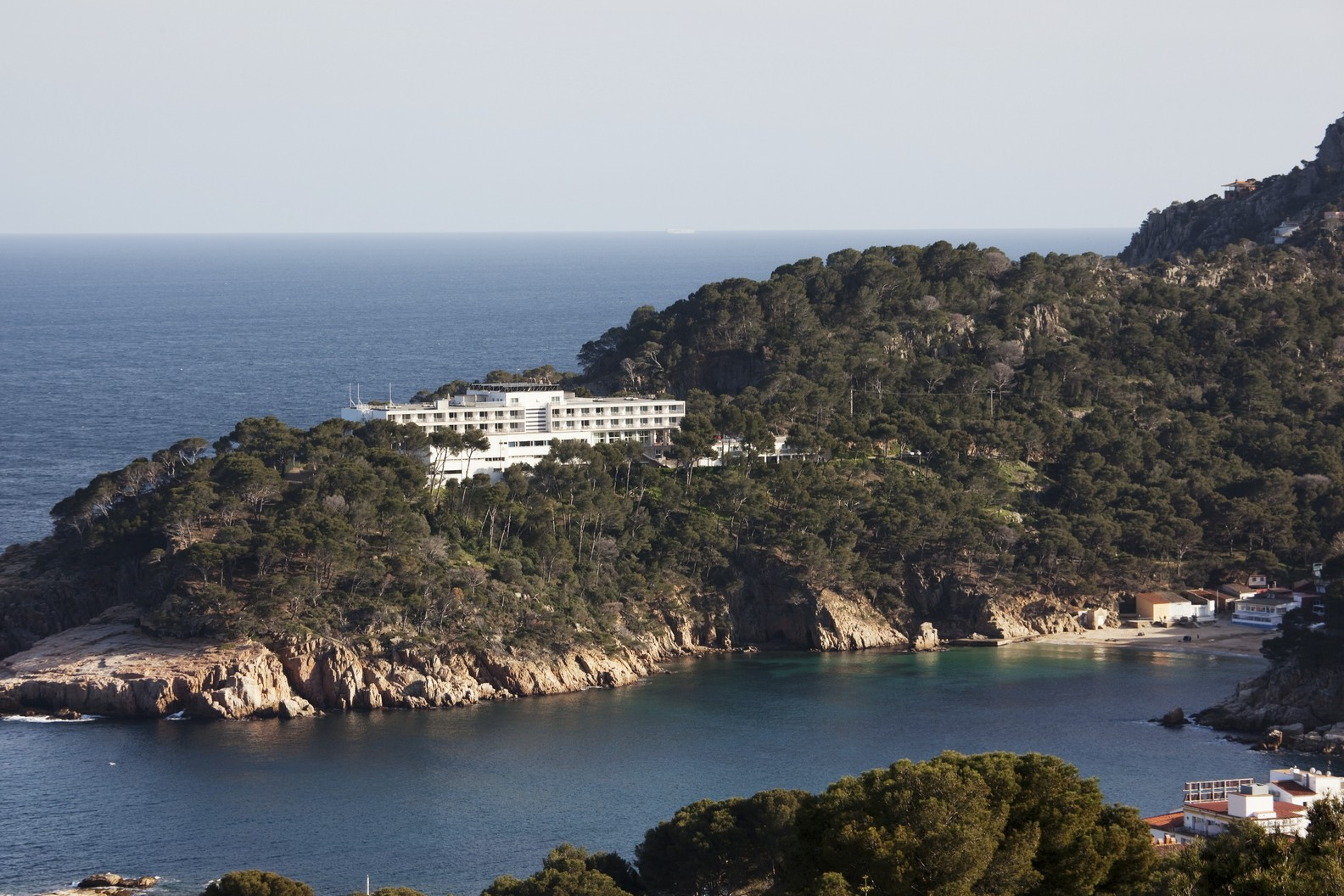
Parador de Aiguablava located in a 1960s building overlooking Aigua Blava bay in Costa Brava.

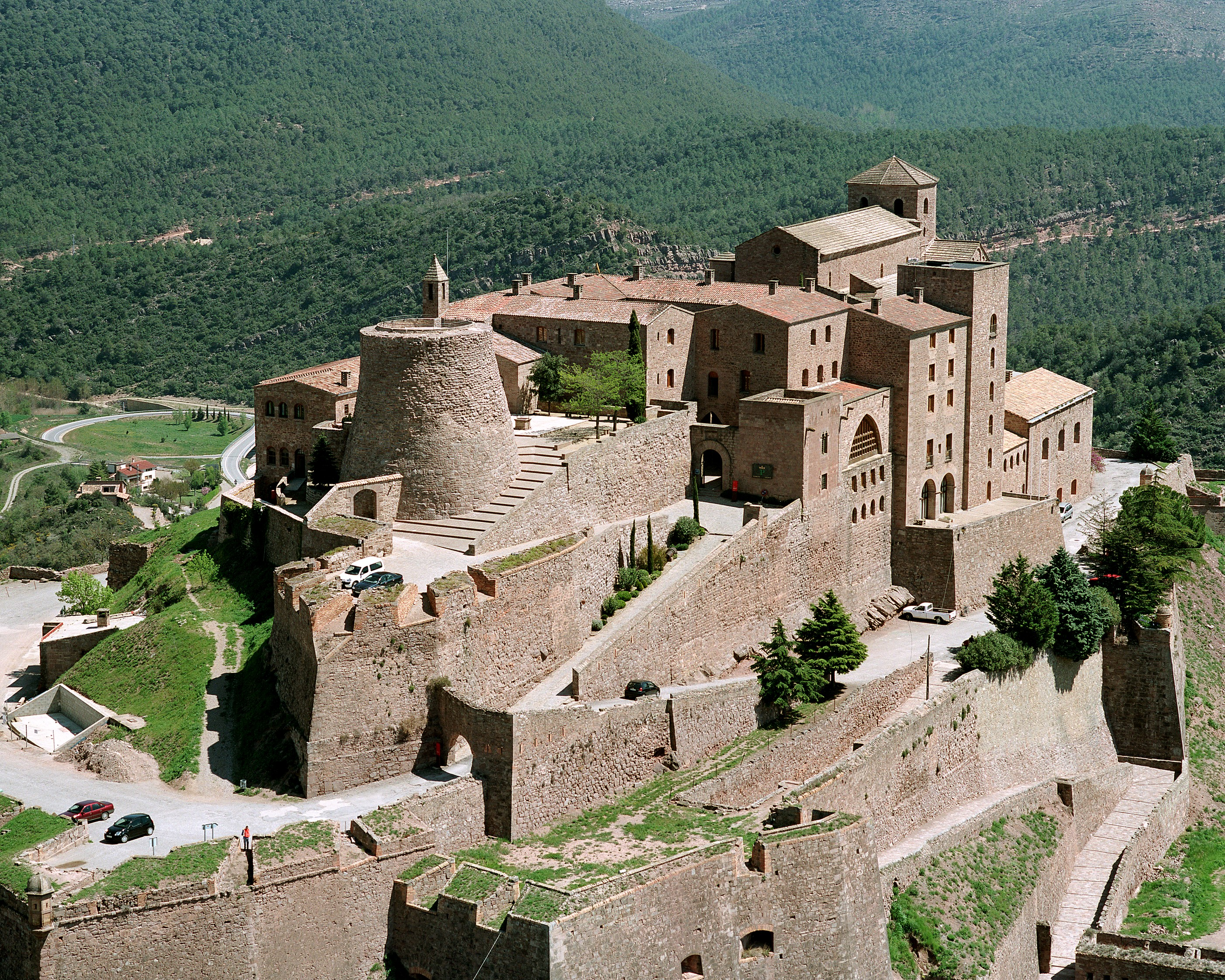
Parador de Cardona located in a Medieval fortress.

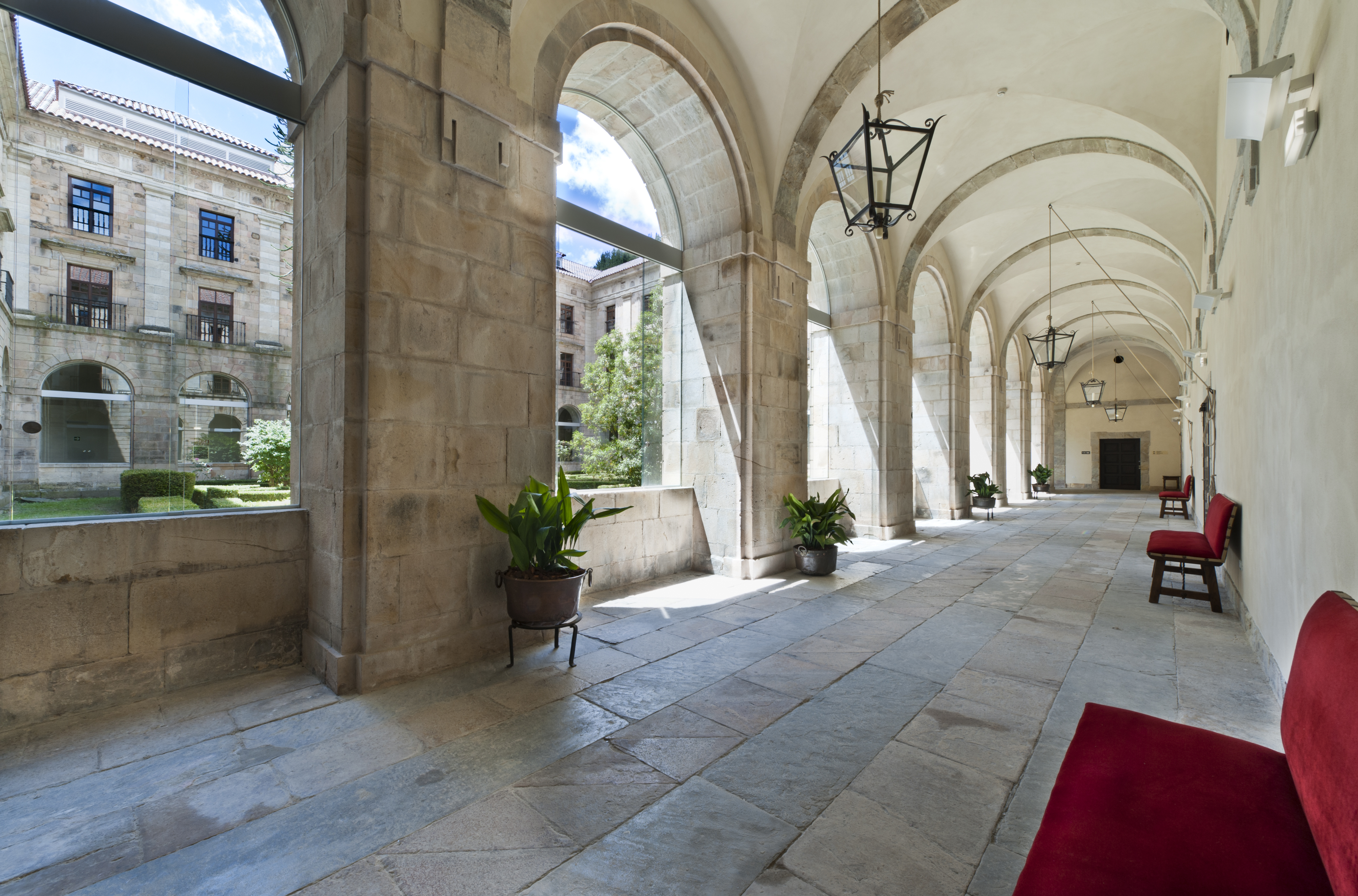
Parador de Corias located in a Neoclassical monastery.

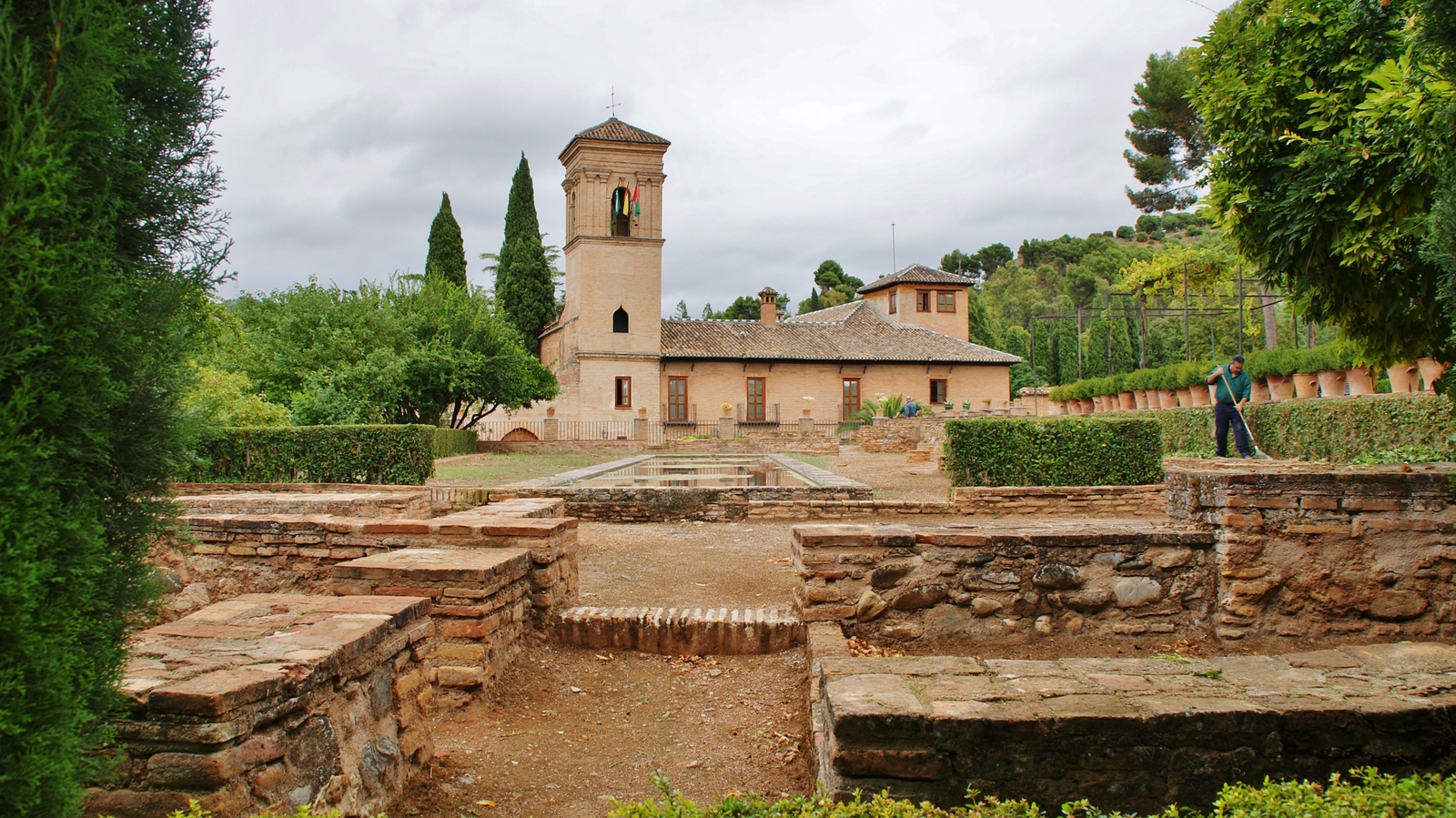
Parador de Granada located in a 15th-century palace inside the Alhambra complex.

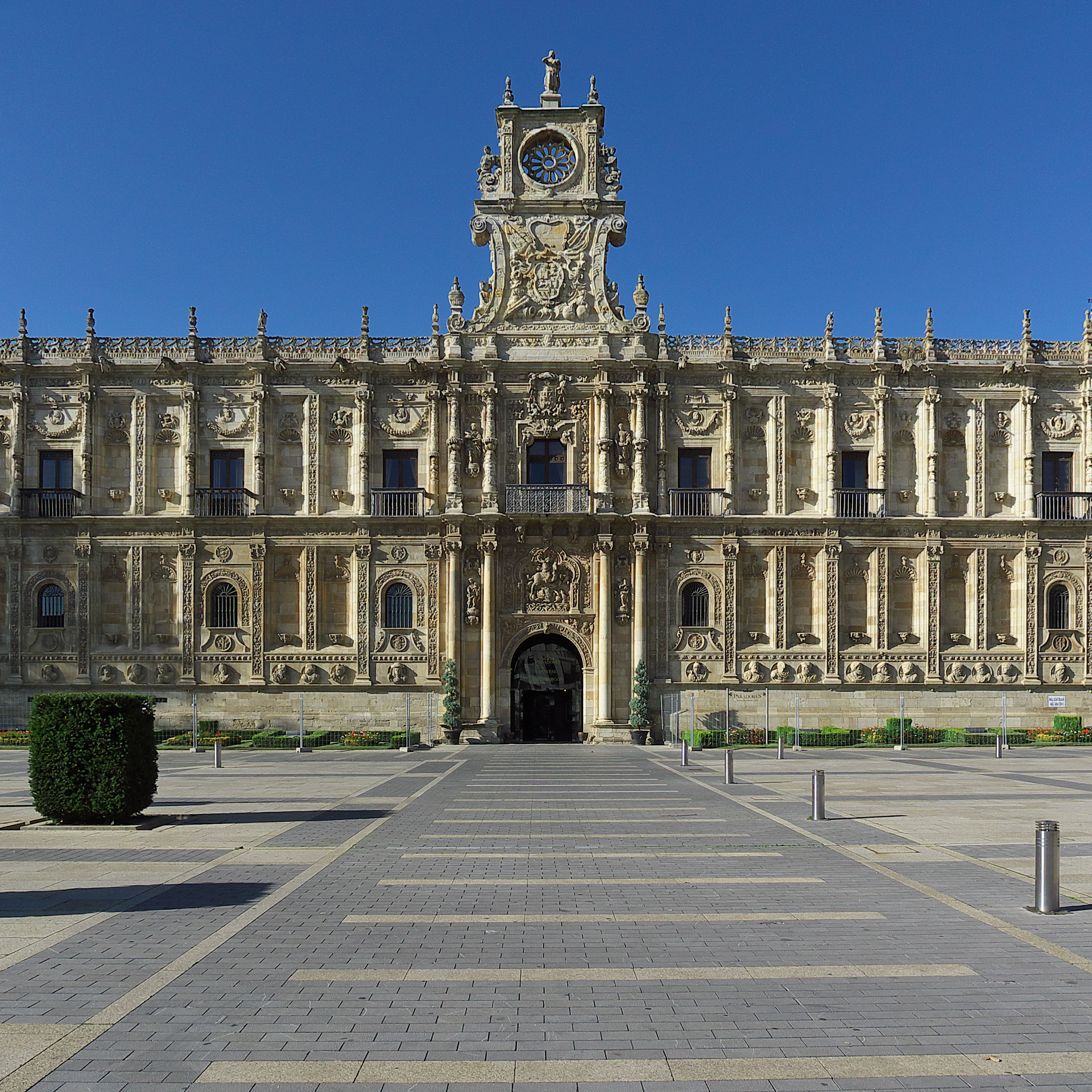
Parador de León located in a Renaissance convent.

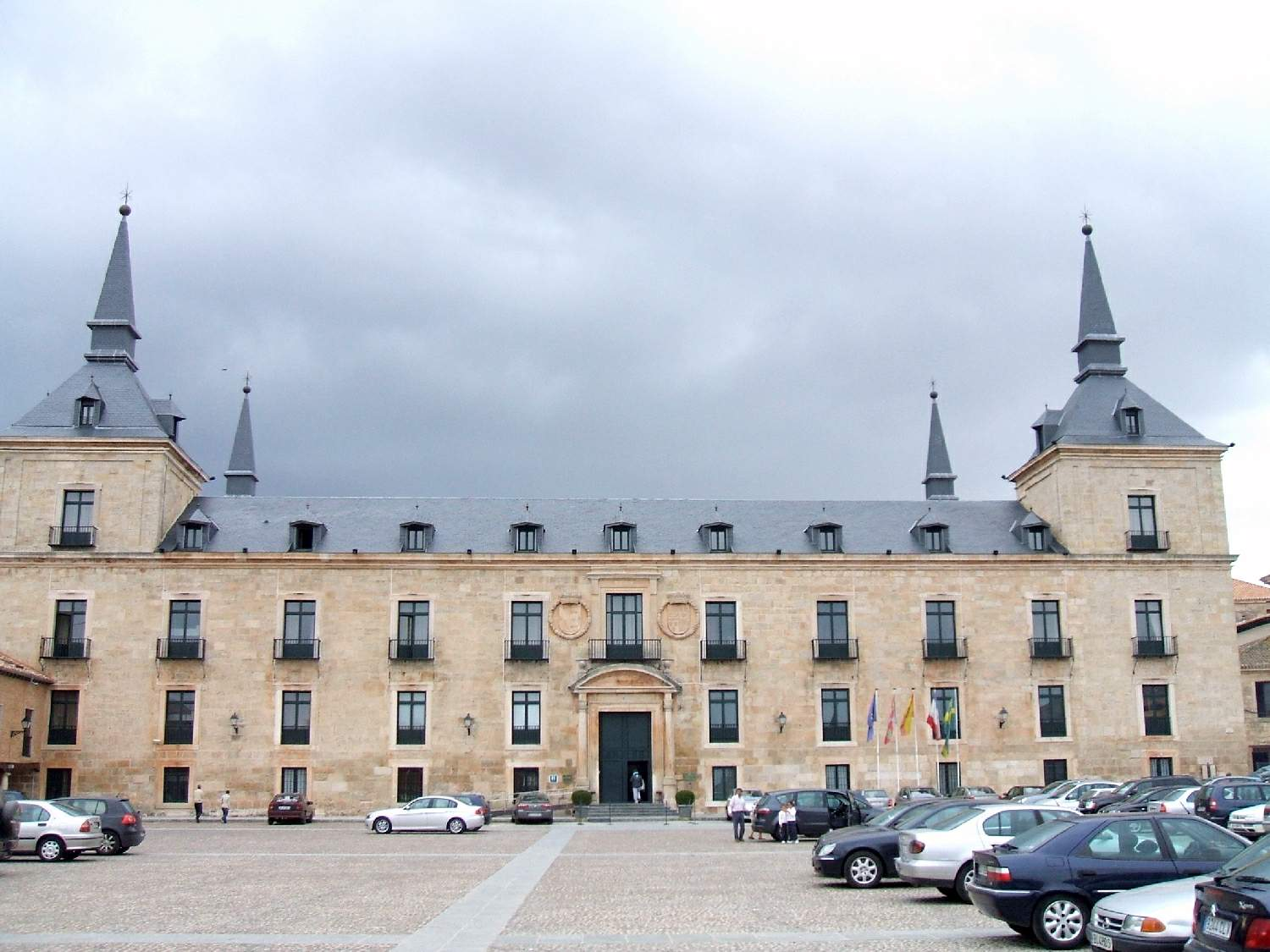
Parador de Lerma located in a Herrerian palace.

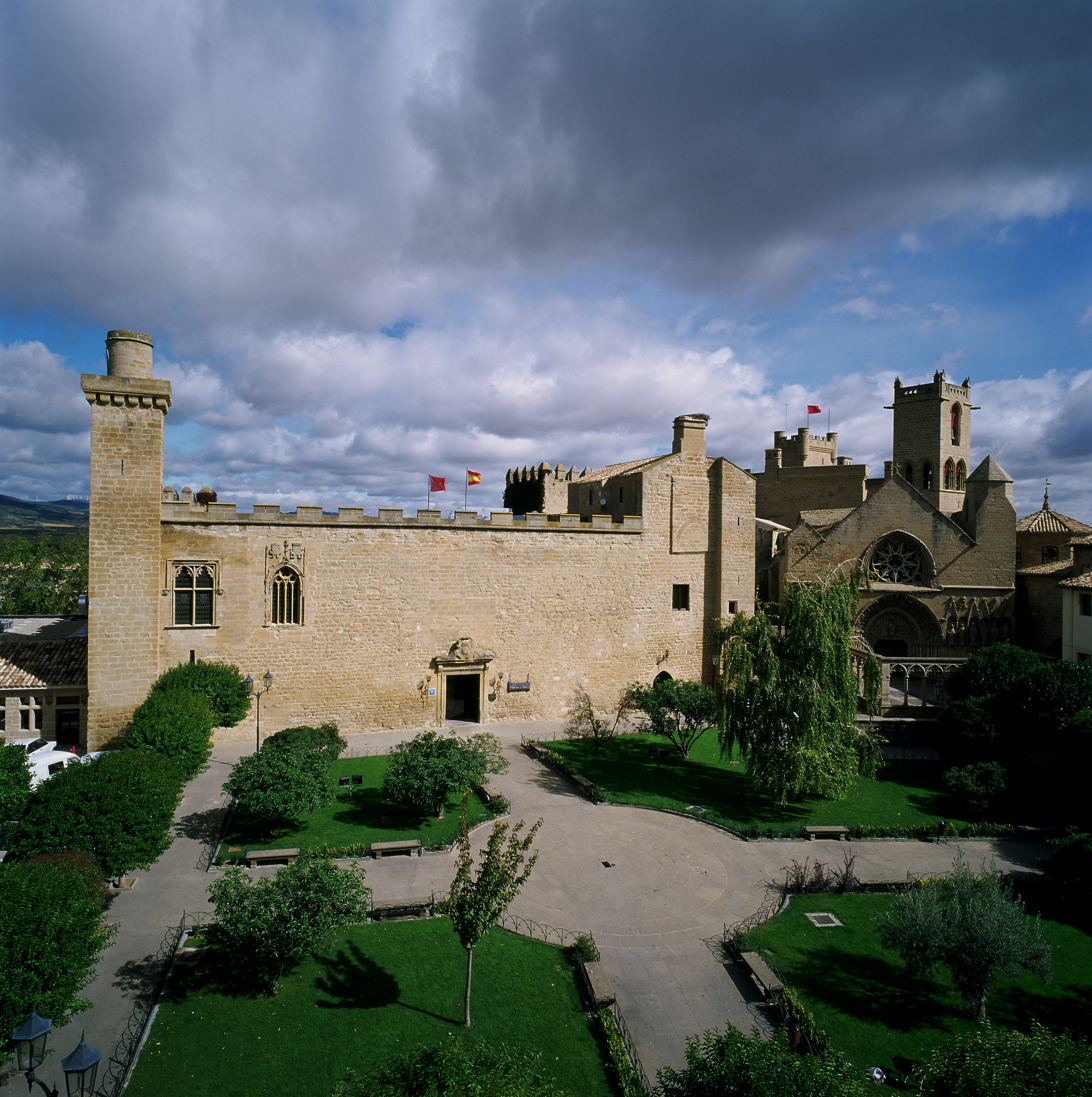
Parador de Olite located in the old Royal Palace of the Kings of Navarre.

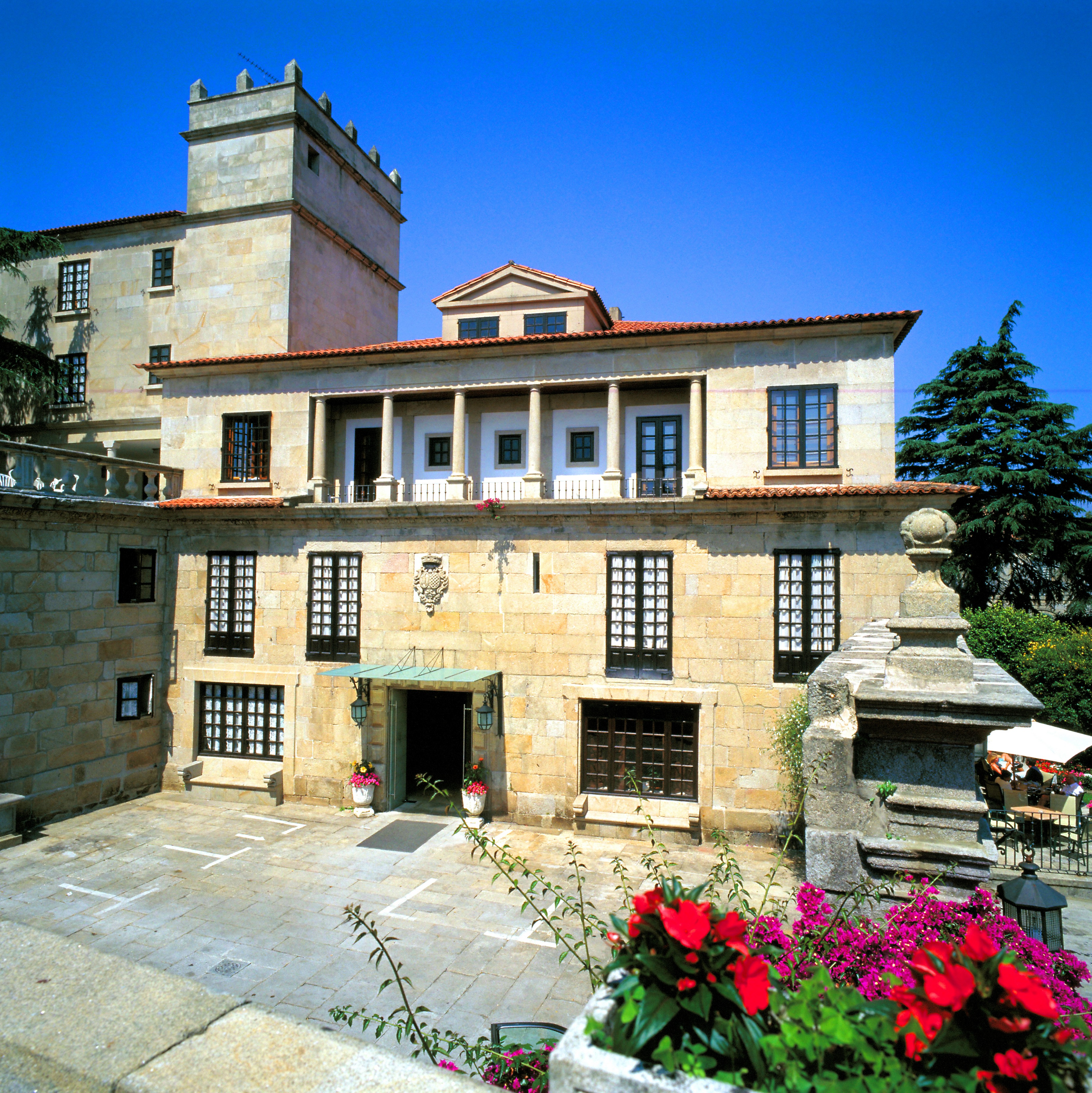
Parador de Pontevedra located in a typical Galician pazo.

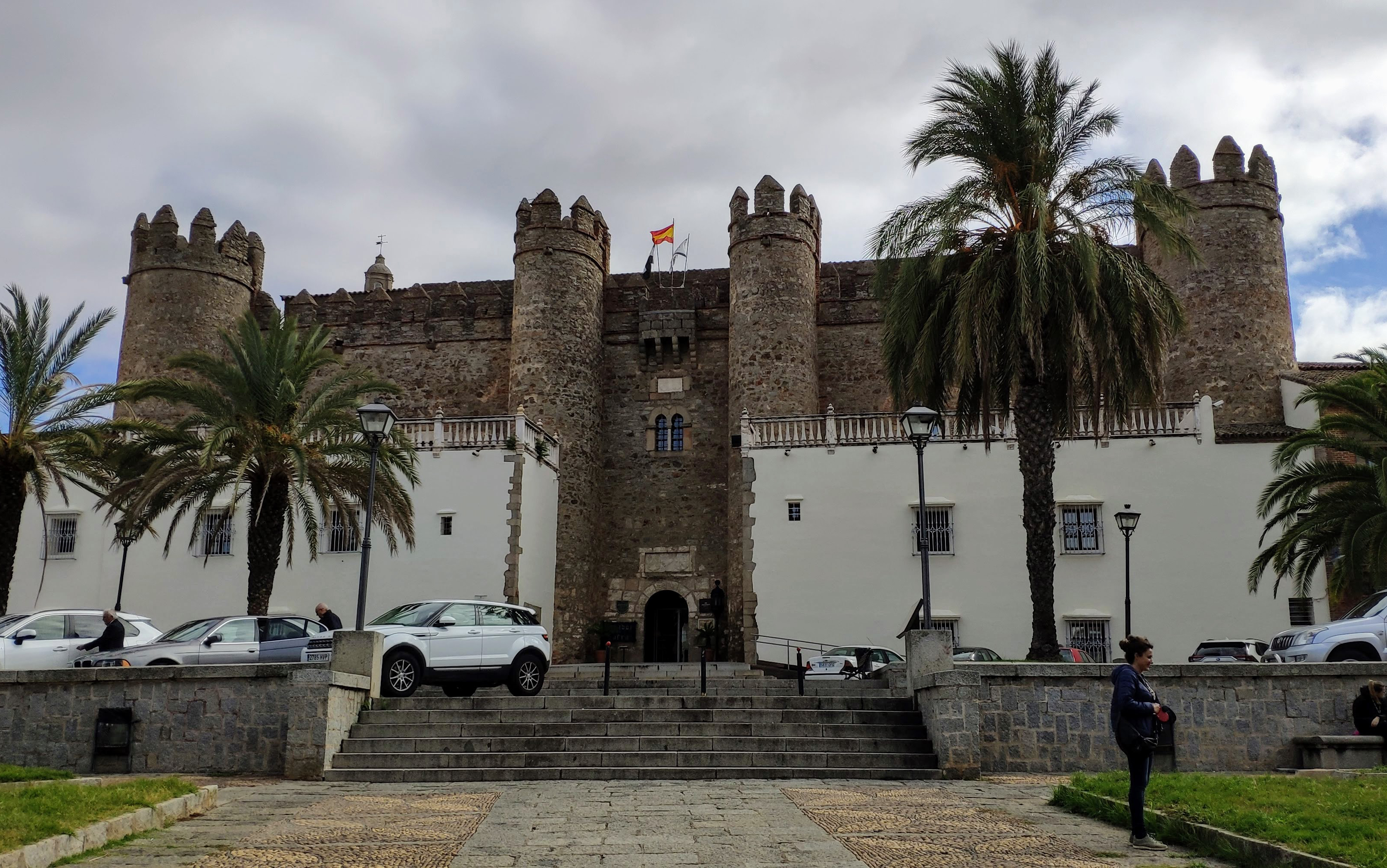
Parador de Zafra located in a Gothic castle.

== Legacy ==
=== Pousadas de Portugal ===
A Portuguese equivalent, Pousadas de Portugal, were founded on 1 May 1941, following the Spanish model, by the Estado Novo at the initiative of António Ferro. The first pousada opened on 19 April 1942 in Elvas.
