= Monastery of San Pedro de Villanueva =

Monastery in Cangues de Onís, Spain

Coordinates: 43°21′59″N 5°09′05″W

- Monasterio de San Pedro de Villanueva
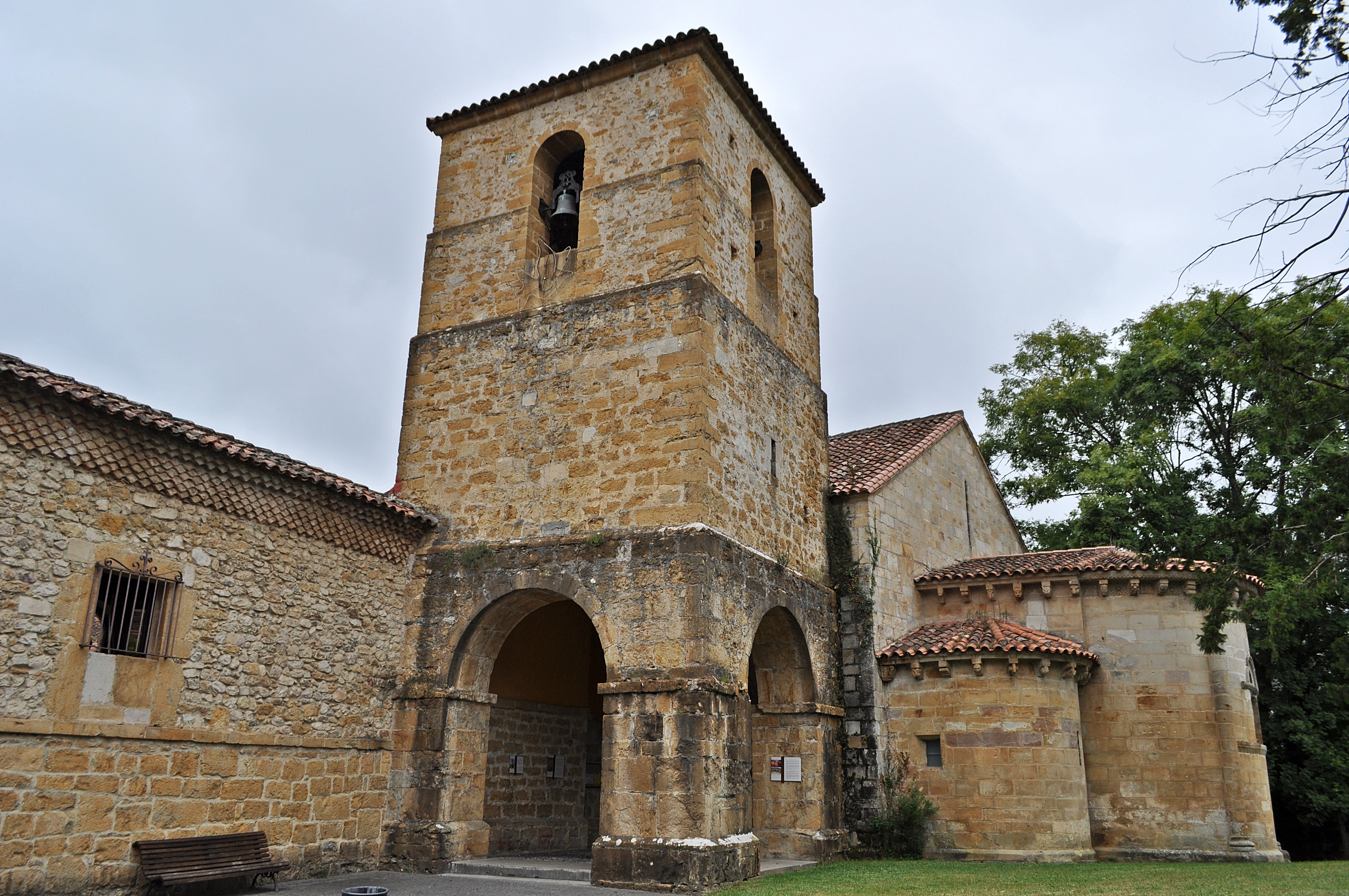
- Romanesque church of the monastery
- Interactive map of the Monastery of San Pedro de Villanueva area
- Alternative names: Parador de Cangas de Onís
- Hotel chain: Paradores

General information
- Location: Cangas de Onís (Asturias), Spain

Website
- Parador de Cangas de Onís

Spanish Cultural Heritage
- Type: Non-movable
- Criteria: Monument
- Designated: 31 July 1907
- Reference no.: RI-51-0000092

The Monastery of San Pedro de Villanueva is a Catholic religious complex located in Villanueva de Cangas, in Cangas de Onis, Asturias, Spain.

This Romanesque monastery was previously owned by the order of Benedictines. A church here supposedly was founded by Alfonso I the Catholic, son in law of Pelagius of Asturias. The remaining structures now date from later periods. In the 12th century, the monastery was built adjacent to the church. The buildings underwent substantial rebuilding after the 17th century. In 1835, the monastery was dissolved. In the present century, the monastery has become a national hotel, a parador. The church is still in use.
