= Navarredonda de Gredos =

- municipality
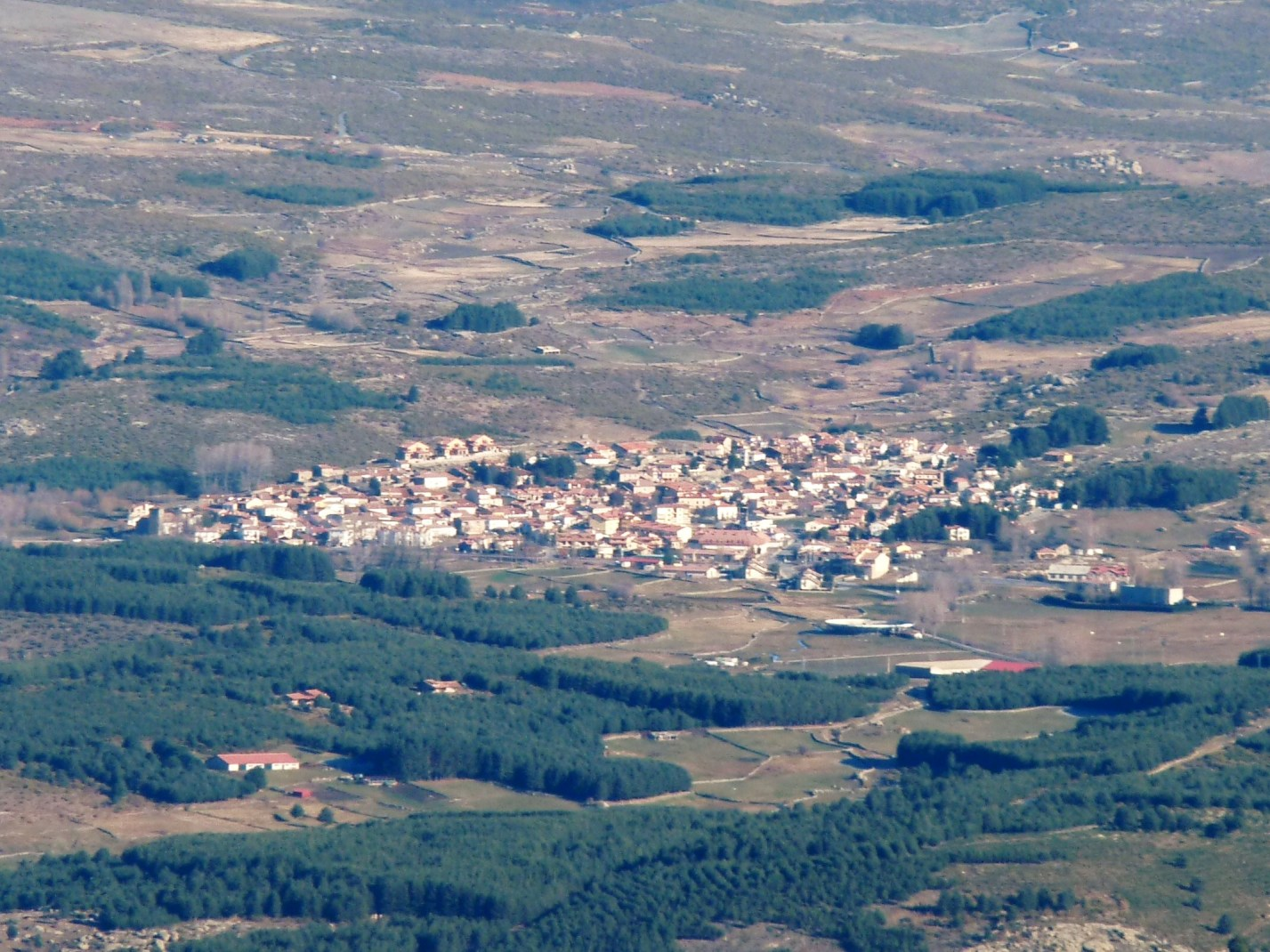
- General view of Navarredonda de Gredos

- Flag Coat of arms

- Location in Spain. Navarredonda de Gredos (Spain)
- Coordinates: 40°21′45″N 5°08′01″W
- Country: Spain
- Autonomous community: Castile and León
- Province: Ávila
- Municipality: Navarredonda de Gredos

Area
  - Total: 78 km^{2} (30 sq mi)
- Elevation: 1,523 m (4,997 ft)

Population (2025-01-01)
  - Total: 451
  - Density: 5.8/km^{2} (15/sq mi)
- Time zone: UTC+1 (CET)
  - Summer (DST): UTC+2 (CEST)
- Website: Official website

Navarredonda de Gredos is a municipality located in the province of Ávila, Castile and León, Spain. The area is located at an elevation of 1,523 metres (4,997 ft) above sea level.

== Population ==
Historical population
Year	Pop.	±% p.a.
2023	442	—
2024	446	+0.90%
2025	451	+1.12%
Source: INE

== Economy ==
Navarredonda de Gredos used to be mainly a village depending on farming, but has become more oriented towards tourism. In addition to the Parador de Gredos, opened on 9 October 1928 as the very first Parador de Turismo, the village has various companies dedicated to activities for tourism, including horse riding excursions. Sierra de Gredos offers the possibility of skiing during the winter.

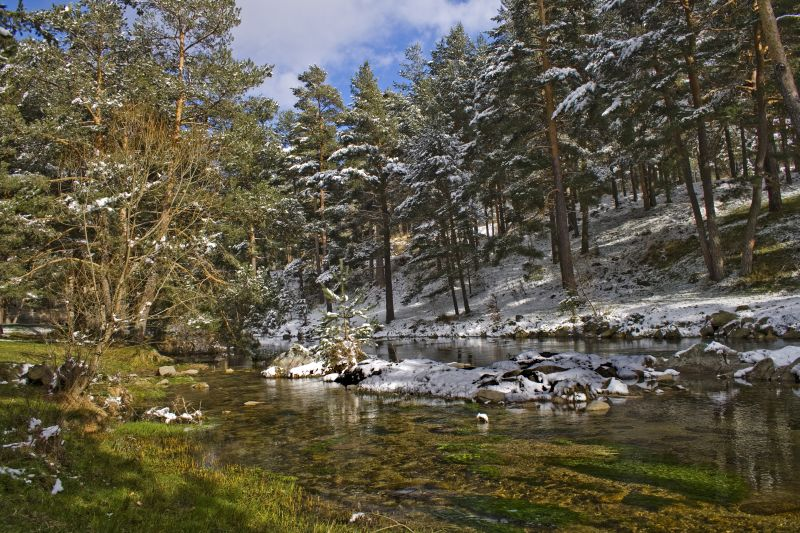
Scotch pine forest near the River Tormes.
