= Monastery of San Vicente do Pino =

Coordinates: 42°31′25″N 7°30′37″W

- Mosteiro de San Vicente do Pino
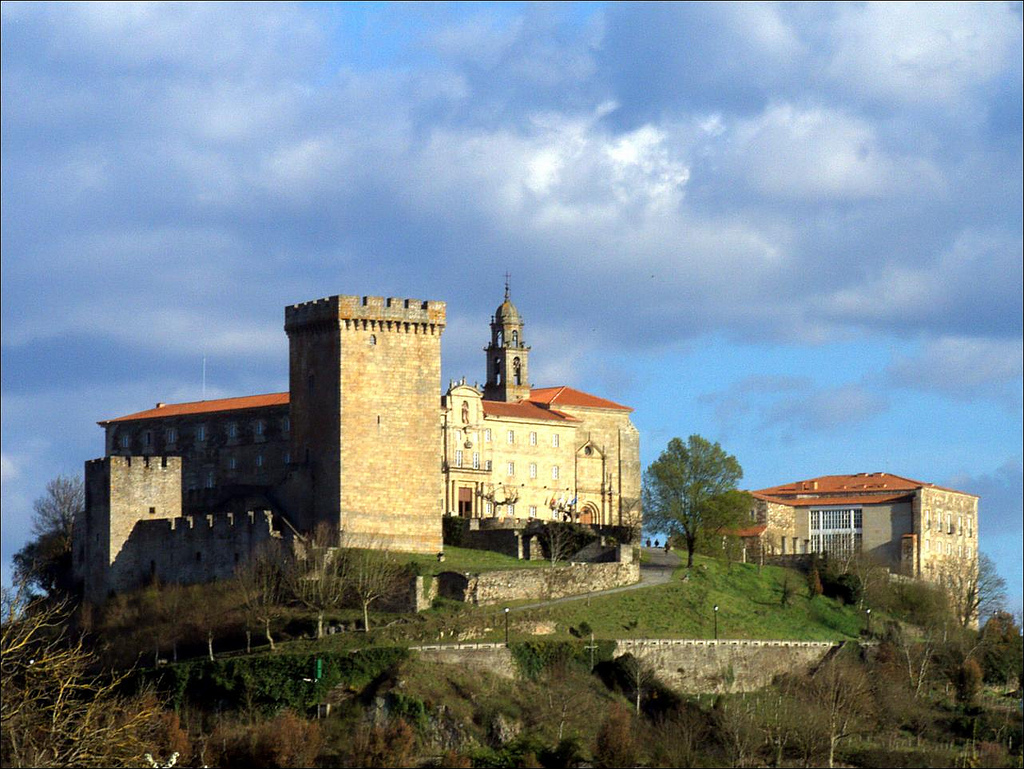
- Alternative names: Parador de Monforte de Lemos
- Hotel chain: Paradores

General information
- Location: Monforte de Lemos (Lugo), Spain

Website
- Parador de Monforte de Lemos

The Monastery of San Vicente do Pino is a former monastery in Monforte de Lemos, Galicia, Spain. It currently houses a parador.

== Gallery ==
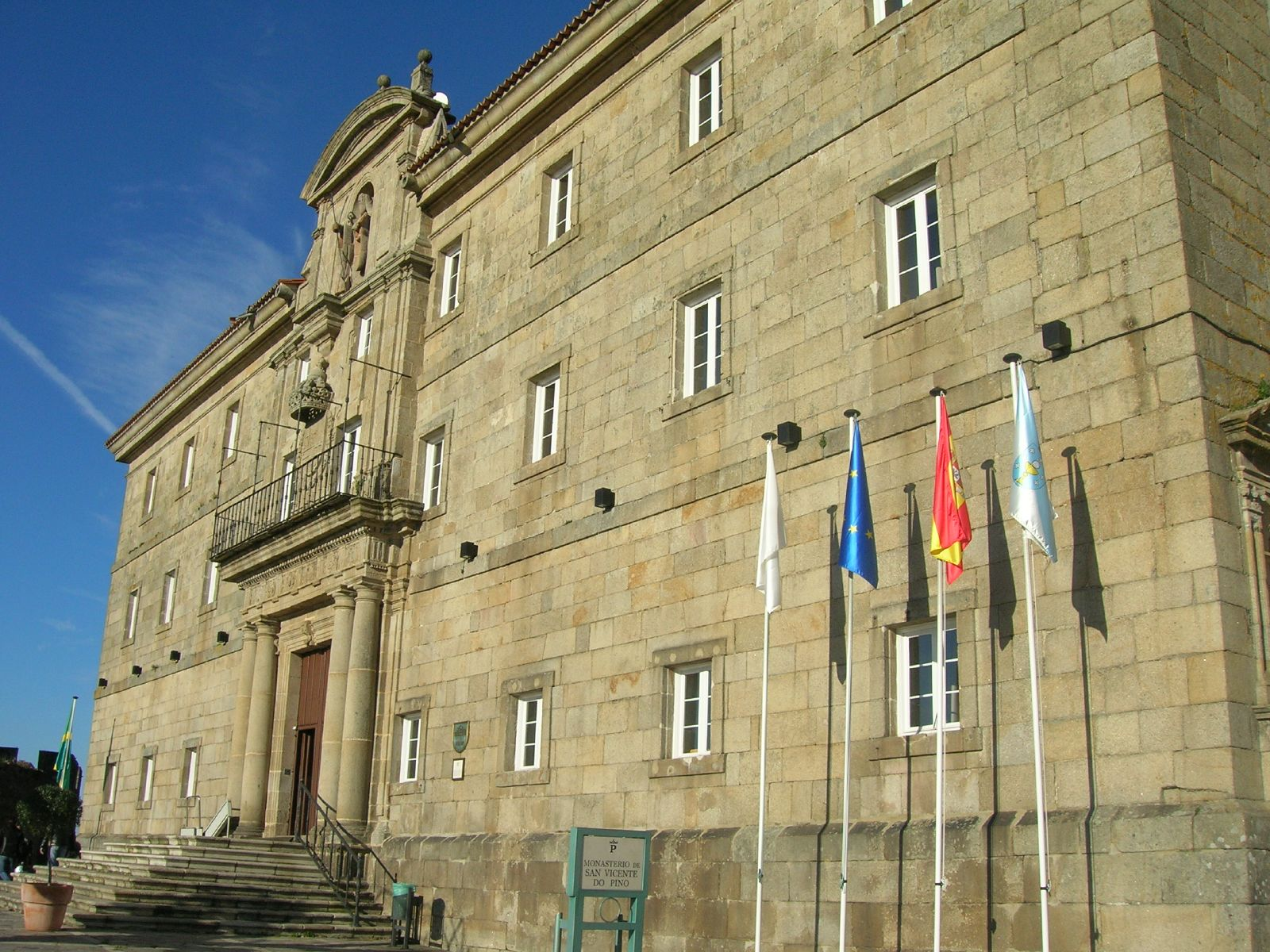
Main façade.

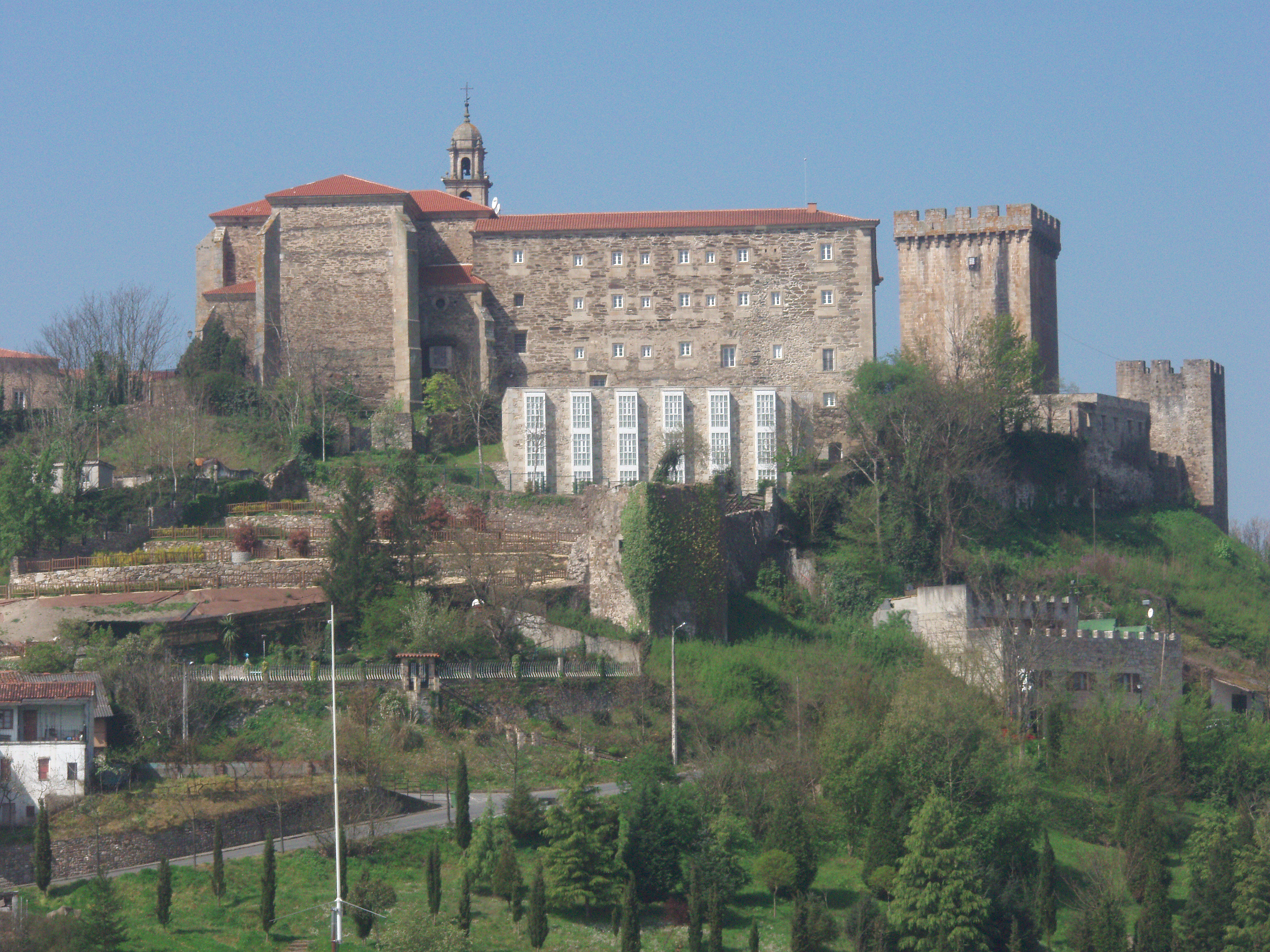
Back View.

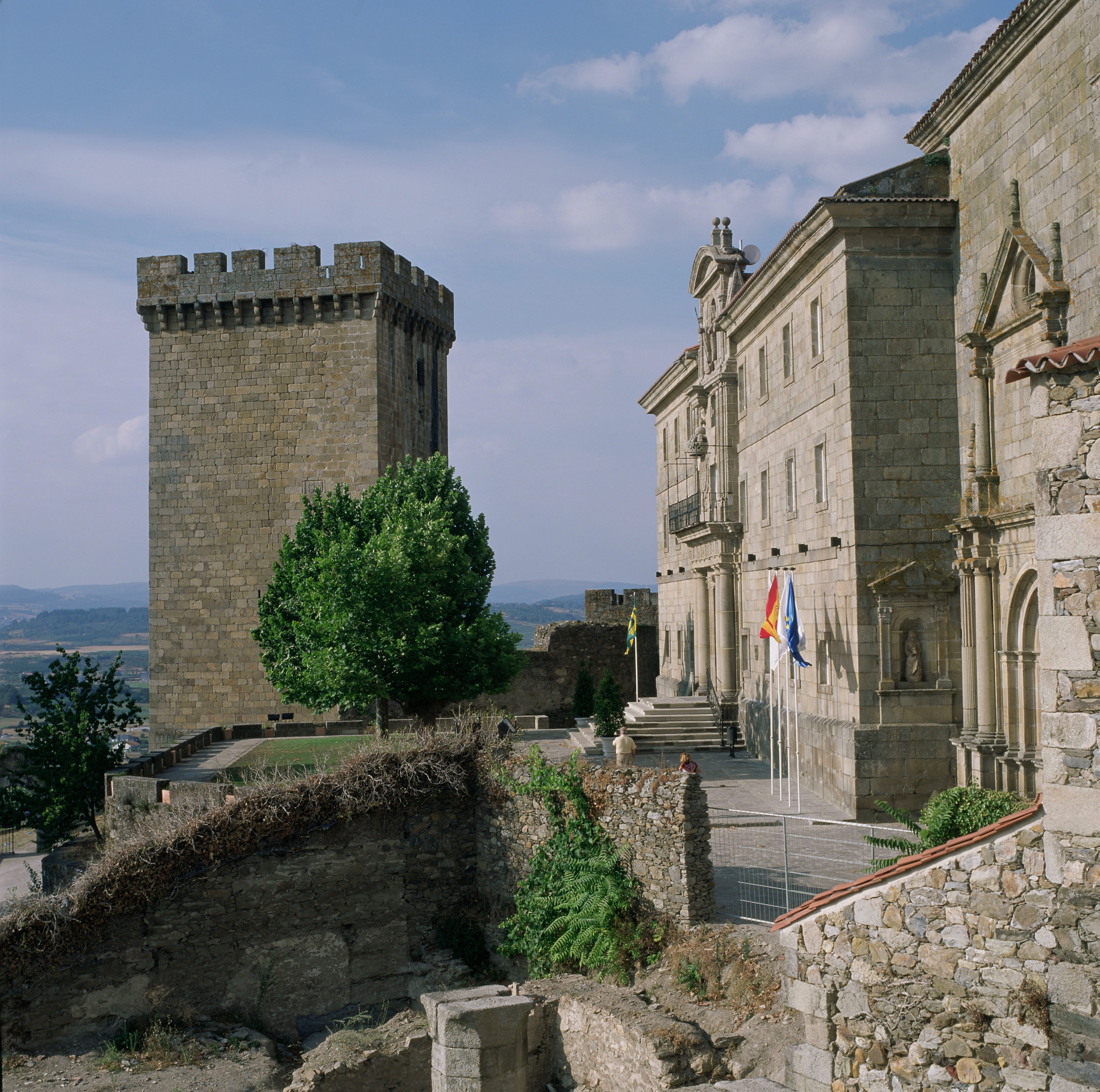
Façade and tower.

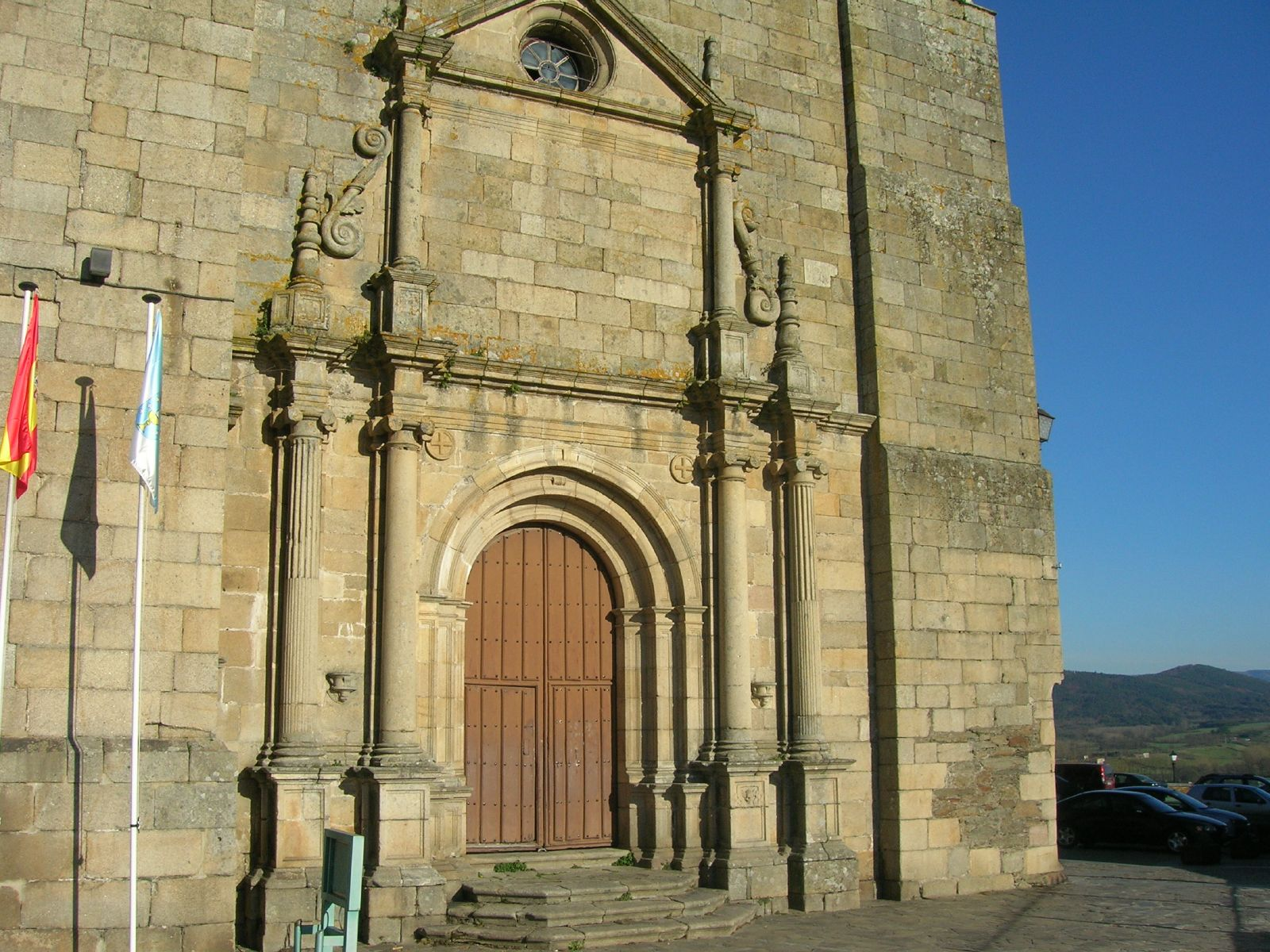
Church entrance.

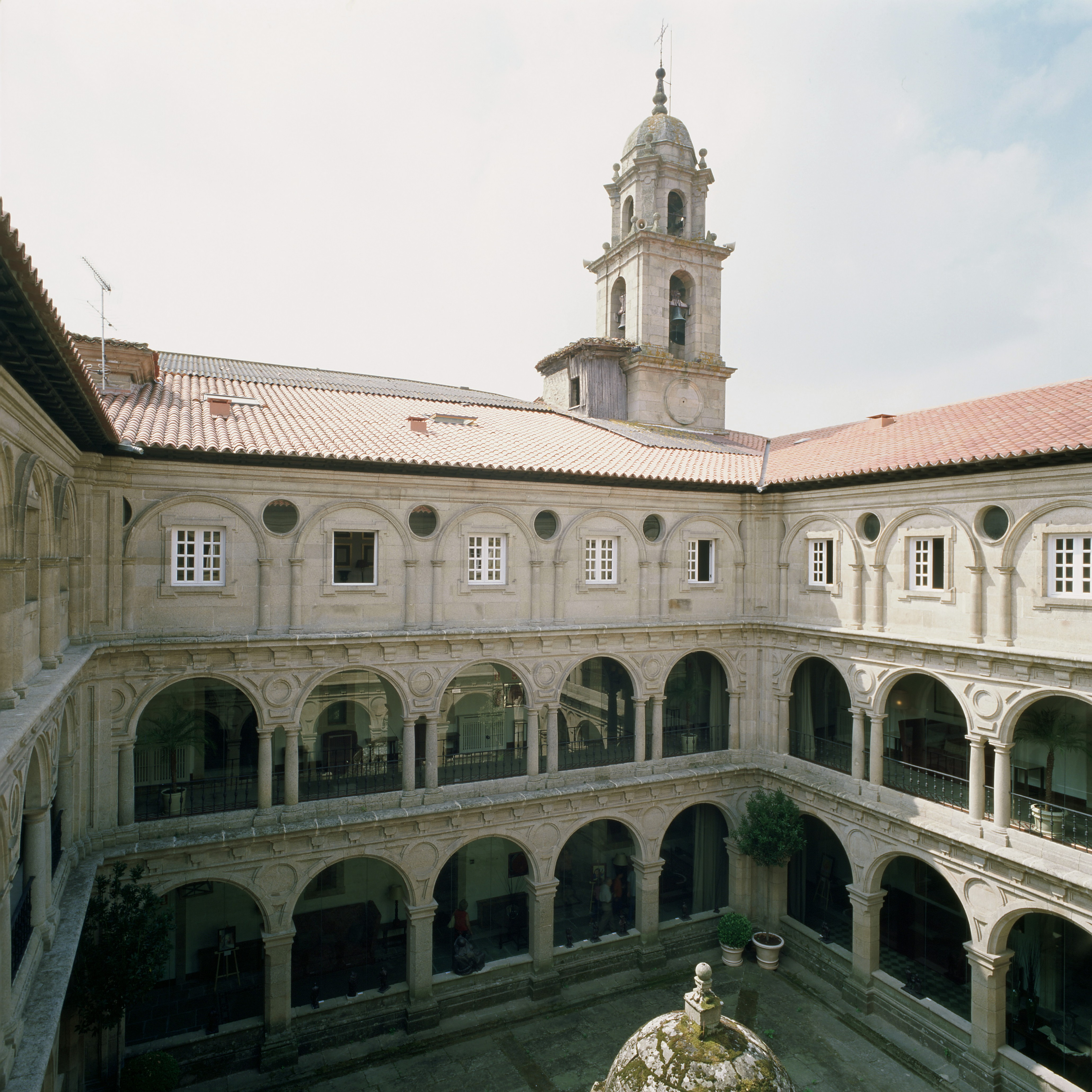
Cloister.

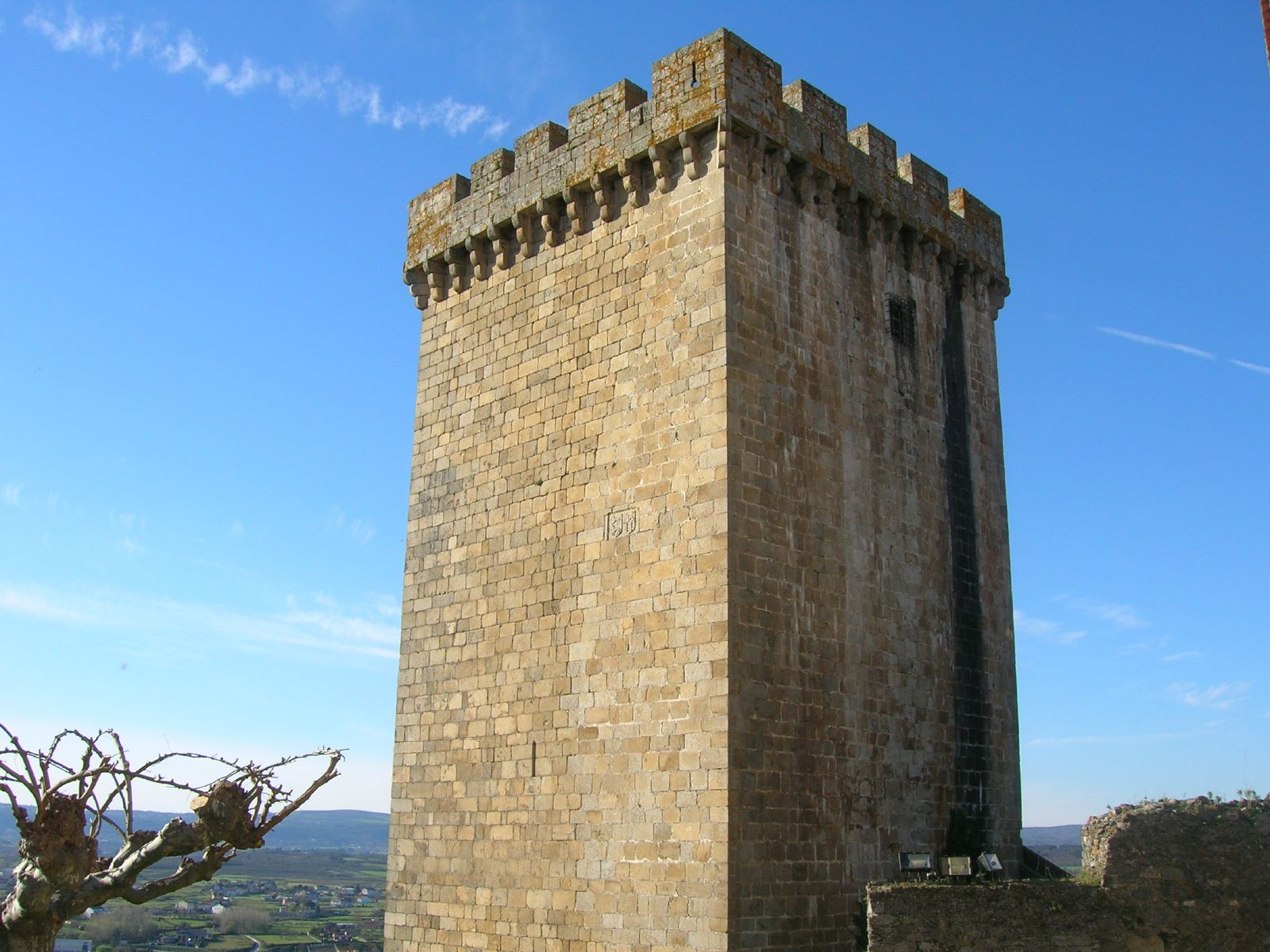
Keep tower.
