= Ducal Palace of Lerma =

Coordinates: 42°01′33.84″N 03°45′18.40″W

- Palacio Ducal de Lerma
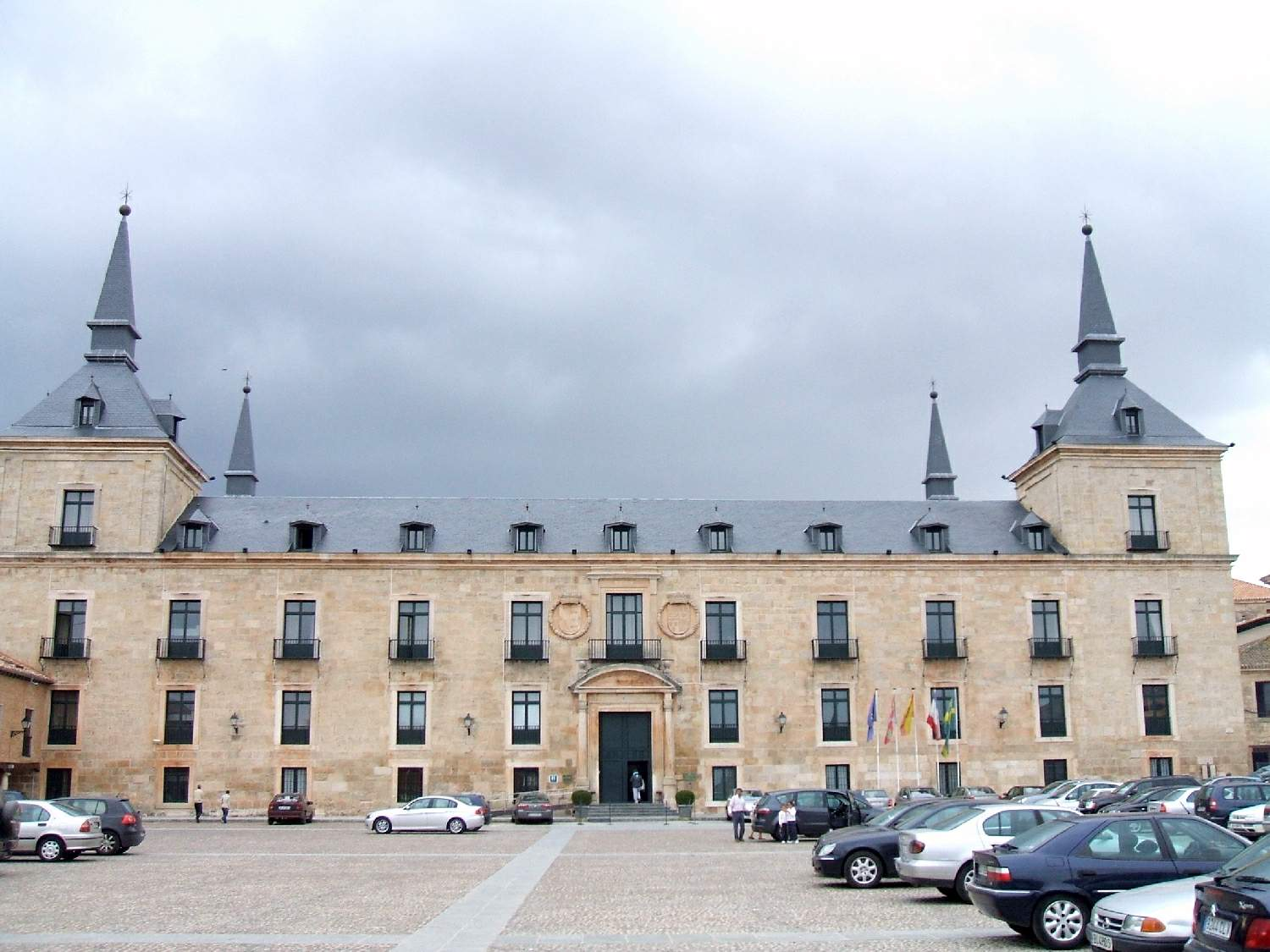
- Alternative names: Parador de Lerma
- Hotel chain: Paradores

General information
- Architectural style: Herrerian
- Location: Lerma (Burgos), Spain

Design and construction
- Architect(s): Francisco de Mora

Website
- Parador de Lerma

The Lerma Ducal Palace is the palace of the dukes of Lerma in Lerma (Burgos) in Spain, occupying the whole of one side of the city's Plaza. Originally it had immense gardens below it, on the banks of the river, with fountains, stately homes and seven chapels, of which one (Cristo) remains. All documents relating to its construction have been conserved. A 17th-century work, building started in 1601 under commission from Francisco Gómez de Sandoval y Rojas, Duke of Lerma. Its architect was Francisco de Mora and is it is considered de Mora's masterwork and one of the finest buildings of that era.

The site was used as Francoist concentration camp. It is currently used as a parador.

== Façade ==
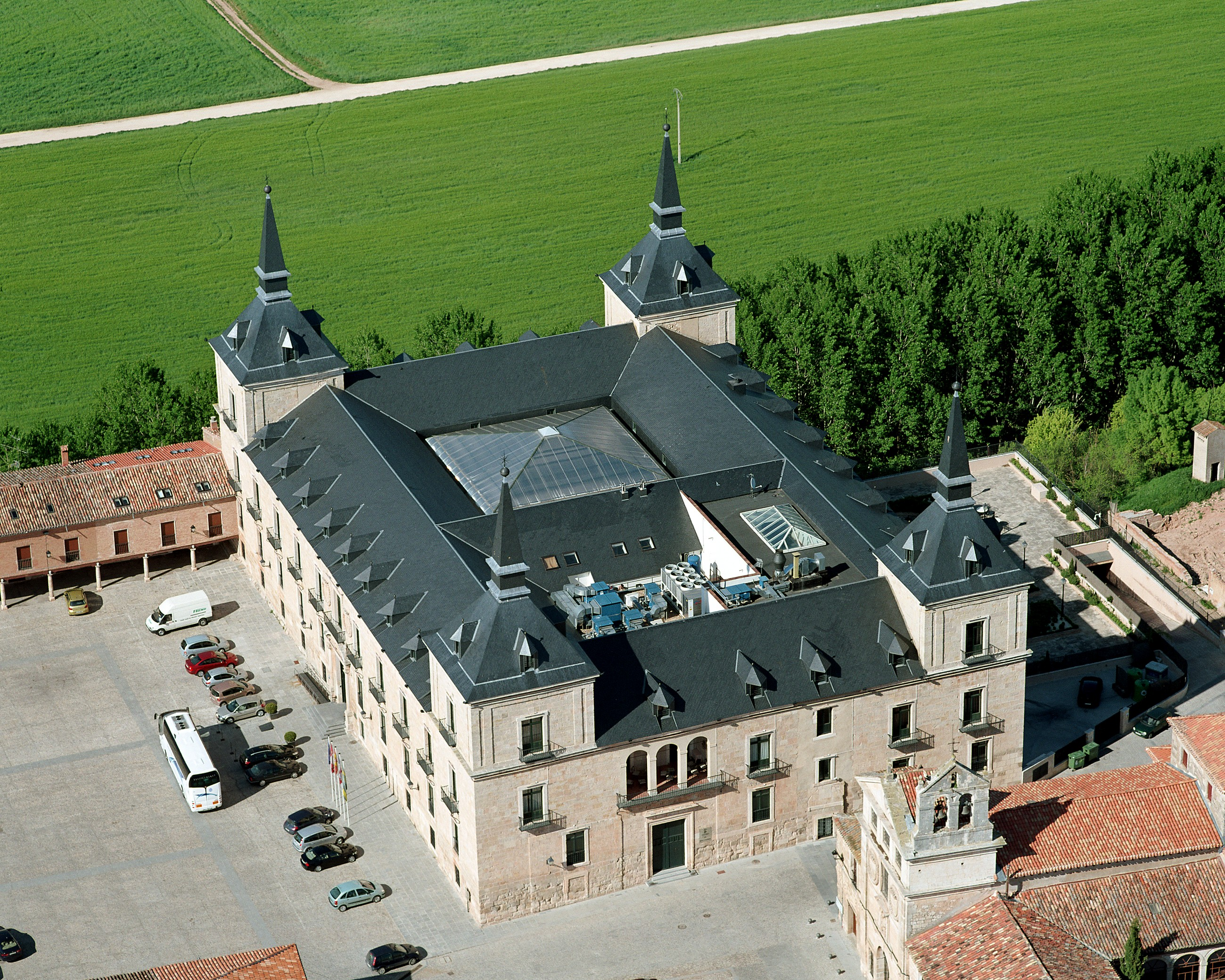
Aerial view of the palace

The doorway is crowned by a frontispiece held up by columns. The large walnut door is decorated with 520 bronze nails. Above the door are two of the duke's coat-of-arms, decorated with laurel. The railings of the windows and balconies are painted blue and gold.

== Patio ==
The interior of the patio round arches on each side. The columns are made of single pieces of granite (the quarries were owned by the duke). On the upper level the columns do not support arches, but rather a running frieze with iron balconies between them, and windows which were originally made from walnut wood.

The palace has four towers at the corners, whose spires were also recovered after the restoration works. No palace could have more than two towers except those belonging to kings, but the Duke of Lerma was given this privilege due to his great powers in Court.
