= Treatise of Garcia of Toledo =

Latin satirical prose work of late 11th century

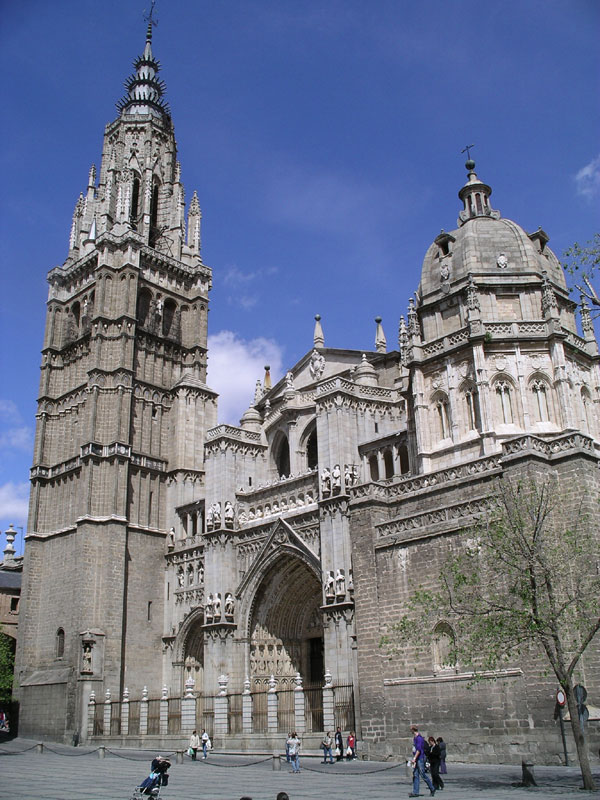
Garcia of Toledo is thought to have been a canon at the Cathedral of Toledo in the late 11th century.

The Treatise of Garcia of Toledo, also known as Tractatus Garsiae Tholetani canonici de Albino et Rufino or The Translation of the Relics of Saints Gold and Silver, was an 11th-century treatise directed against the corruption of the Roman curia. Describing the continuous feasting of the Pope, his cardinals, and his curia, the Treatise is essentially a satirical description of the actual historical visit of Bernard de Sedirac, Archbishop of Toledo, to Rome in May 1099.

In the Treatise, Bernard de Sedirac, thinly disguised as the churchman "Grimoard," travels to Rome to offer to Urban II the relics of Saints "Albinus and Rufinus" in exchange for the legateship of Aquitaine. Albinus and Rufinus are not saints at all, but silver and gold, respectively – a medieval joke for bribery.

In a parody of the litany, the Pope drinks to all and to everything, and the author transforms the pope and his cardinals into insatiable, bibulous gluttons capable of the most astounding feats of dissipation: "So, when this fattest of popes had tasted three or four draughts, as though by necessity, the cardinals emptied the bowl after him... Then once again Bacchus filled the golden bowl!"

The authorship of this anticlerical text is uncertain. In the text, Garcia of Toledo claims to be a canon of the church. The manuscript's first editor, J. von Pflugk-Harttung, proposed in 1883 that the work was written by a person loyal to Henry IV, Holy Roman Emperor and the antipope Guibert of Ravenna -that is, loyal to the parties that opposed Pope Urban II. Some scholars believe that he may indeed have been what he claims to be: a Spaniard who by chance had come along with the Toledan archbishop. As Rodney M. Thomson points out, no one but a Spaniard would have considered Bernard’s visit to Rome sufficiently noteworthy to form the narrative basis of his parody.
