= Zafra =

Town in Extremadura, Spain

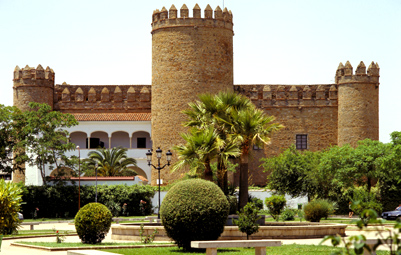
- The Castle of Zafra

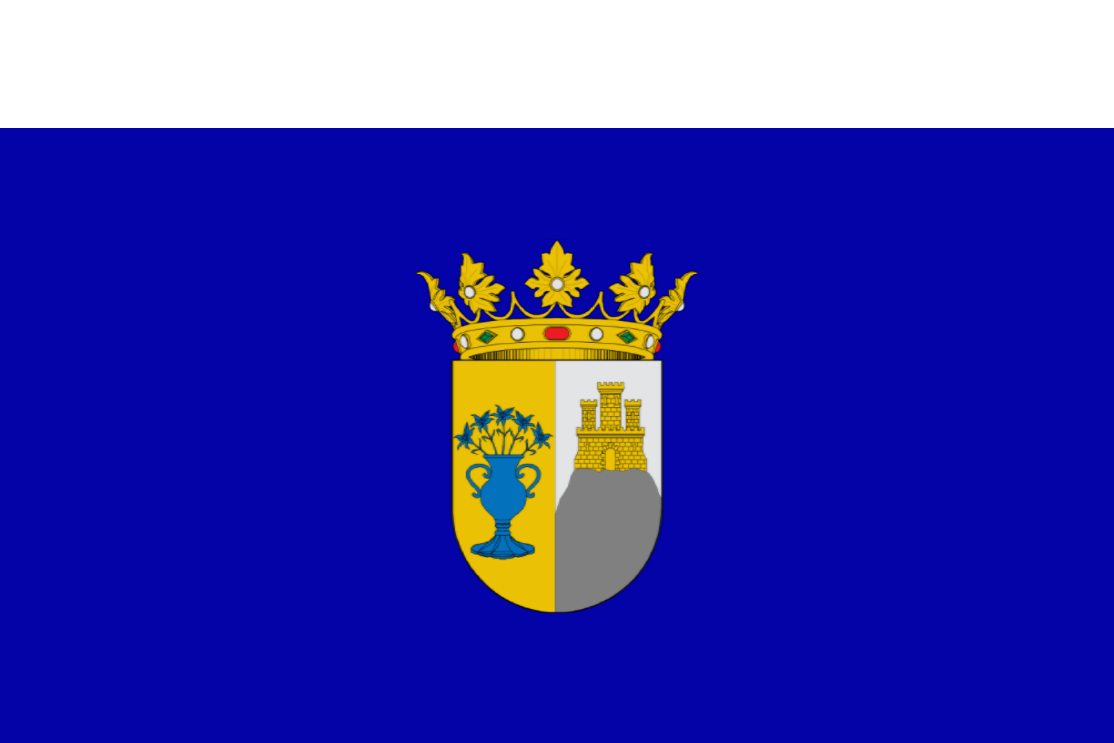
- Flag Coat of arms

- Location in Spain.
- Coordinates: 38°25′N 6°25′W
- Country: Spain
- Autonomous community: Extremadura
- Province: Badajoz
- Comarca: Zafra - Río Bodión

Government
  - Mayor: Juan Carlos Fernández Calderón (Partido Popular)

Area
  - Total: 62.6 km^{2} (24.2 sq mi)
- Elevation: 508 m (1,667 ft)

Population (2025)
  - Total: 16,735
  - Density: 267/km^{2} (692/sq mi)
- Demonym(s): Zafrenses, Segedanos/as
- Time zone: UTC+1 (CET)
  - Summer (DST): UTC+2 (CEST)
- Website: Official website

Zafra (Spanish: [ˈθa.fɾa]; Extremaduran: Çafra) is a town in the Province of Badajoz (Extremadura, Spain), and the capital of the comarca of Zafra - Río Bodión. It has a population of 16,677, according to the 2011 census.

Zafra is the hometown of Fray Ruy Lopez, author of one of the first European treatises on chess, and the humanist Pedro de Valencia.

== Roman era ==
Zafra has been associated with the Roman names Restituta Iulia Imperial, Contributa Iulia Ugultunia, and Segida Restituta Iulia, though this applies equally to some of the other towns in the area. The name Contributa Julia appears on an 1849 map of Roman Hispania (in the south-west of Spain, in the area named Baeturia) alongside the name Regina (presently associated with the ruins of a small Roman town of the same name), lending some geographical support to the possibility of an association of the name Contributa Iulia or Contributa Julia with Zafra. Other sources, however, support an association of the name Segida Restituta Iulia with Zafra. Yet other, authoritative, sources associate no Roman name with Zafra. In the area round Zafra may be found the remains of as many as 20 Roman villas. These, and associations between the name Restitutia Iulia and a migration from the legendary Segeda, may be linked to the origin of the town.

== Notable residents ==
- Ana Peláez Narváez (born 1966), disability rights activist.

== See also ==
- List of municipalities in Badajoz
