= Ana Peláez Narváez =

Spanish disability rights activist (born 1966)

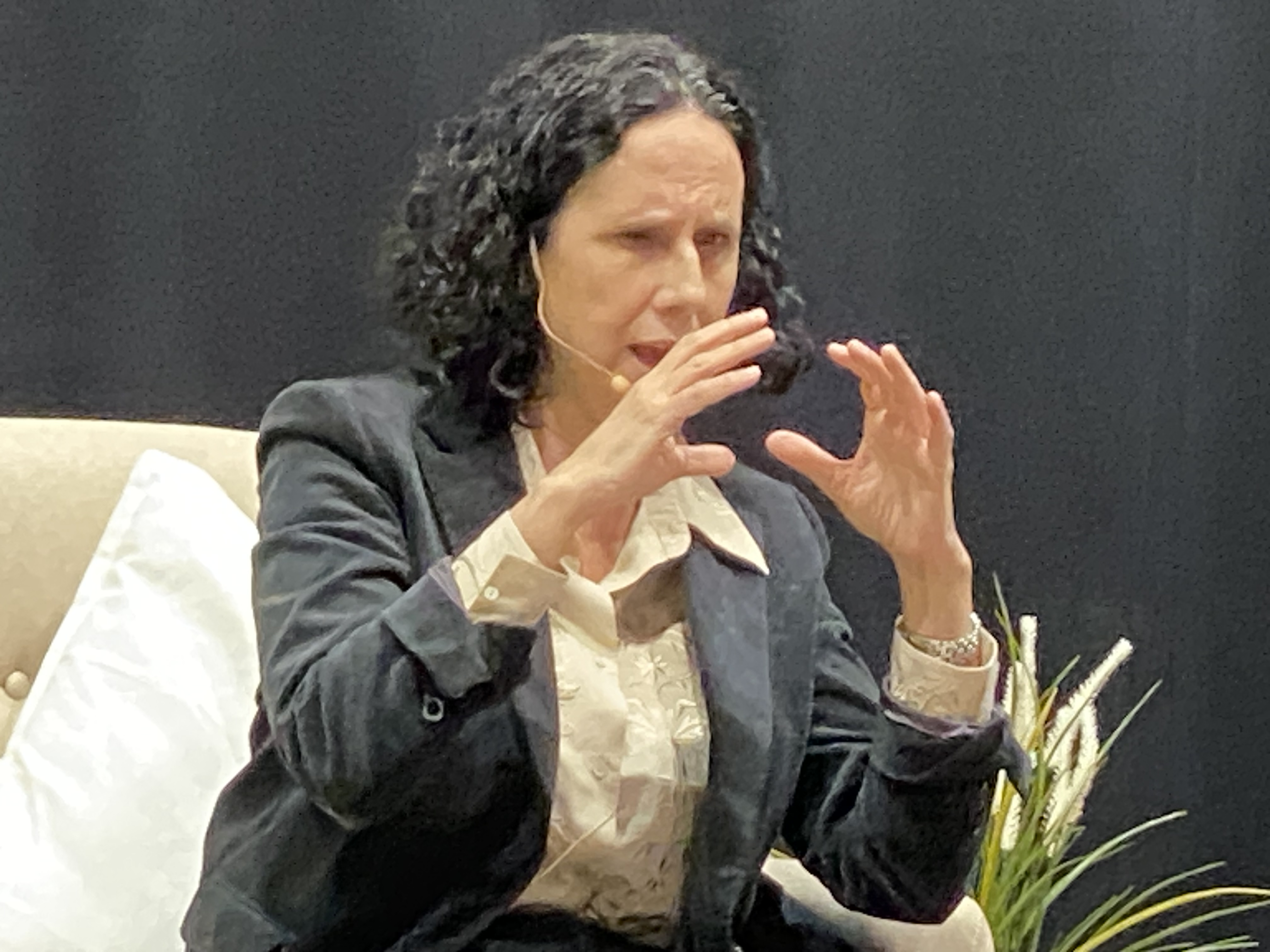
- Peláez speaking at the United Nations in 2023
- Born: 4 October 1966 (age 59); Zafra, Extremadura, Spain
- Education: University of Seville; University of Salamanca
- Occupation: Disability rights activist
- Years active: 2000–present
- Employer: United Nations
- Honours: Order of Isabella the Catholic

Ana Peláez Narváez (born 4 October 1966) is a Spanish human rights activist and disability expert. She was the first woman with a disability to sit on the United Nations Committee on the Elimination of Discrimination against Women, and was previously a member of the Committee on the Rights of Persons with Disabilities.

== Early life and education ==
Peláez was born in 1966 in Zafra, a town in Extremadura, Spain. She was blind from birth. After attending a specialist ONCE school in Seville, Peláez later transferred to a mainstream secondary school, and also studied for a time at the Lycée Saint Ubert in Brussels, Belgium.

Paláez started her undergraduate studies at the University of Seville, graduating with a degree in education and psychology. She completed her postgraduate and doctoral studies on the needs of people with disabilities at the University of Salamanca.

== Activism ==
=== In Spain ===
Peláez has been a long-term member of the Spanish National Organisation of the Blind (ONCE). Between 2000 and 2007, she was a member of ONCE's General Council. In 2003, Peláez became its executive president in Latin America. After 2007, she served as ONCE's director of international relations, representing the organisation at multiple bodies, including the European Blind Union, the Latin American Union of the Blind, the World Blind Union, and the International Council for Education of People with Visual Impairment.

Between 2004 and 2014, Peláez was the president of the women's commission of the Comité Español de Representantes de Personas con Discapacidad (CERMI; lit. 'Spanish Committee of Representatives of People with Disabilities') before going on to become its commissioner on gender issues. She has represented CERMI before the Congress of Deputies, the Senate of Spain, and the European Parliament. Peláez sits on the Royal Board of Disability Issues, which advises the Spanish government on its disability policies, and well as on the Ministry of Health and Ministry of Social Affairs' councils on women in politics and violence against women.

=== In Europe ===
Peláez is a member of the European Disability Forum's executive committee and management board, where she also chairs the women's board and leads on gender issues. She has been a member of the EDF since 2001; in 2017, she became its vice president. Since 2010, Peláez has represented the EDF at the European Women's Lobby, and was later elected to the EWL's management board by its assembly.

=== For the United Nations ===
Peláez participated in the drafting of the Convention on the Rights of Persons with Disabilities as a delegate of the Spanish government. She subsequently observed Spain signing the convention at a ceremony on 30 March 2007; as well as the official deposit of the ratification on 3 December 2007.

On 3 November 2008, Peláez was elected as one of twelve experts to serve on the United Nations' Committee on the Rights of Persons with Disabilities, becoming its first vice president. She was re-elected to the committee in 2013, serving until 2016.

In June 2018, Peláez was elected to the United Nations Committee on the Elimination of Discrimination against Women, becoming its first member with a disability. She was re-elected for a further term in 2022, and acted as the committee's chair between 2023 and 2024.

== Recognition ==
For her work on the Convention on the Rights of Persons with Disabilities, Peláez was awarded the Order of Isabella the Catholic by Juan Carlos I.
