= Convent of San Pablo (Cuenca) =

Convent in Castilla–La Mancha, Spain

Coordinates: 40.0791°N 2.1263°W

- Convento de San Pablo
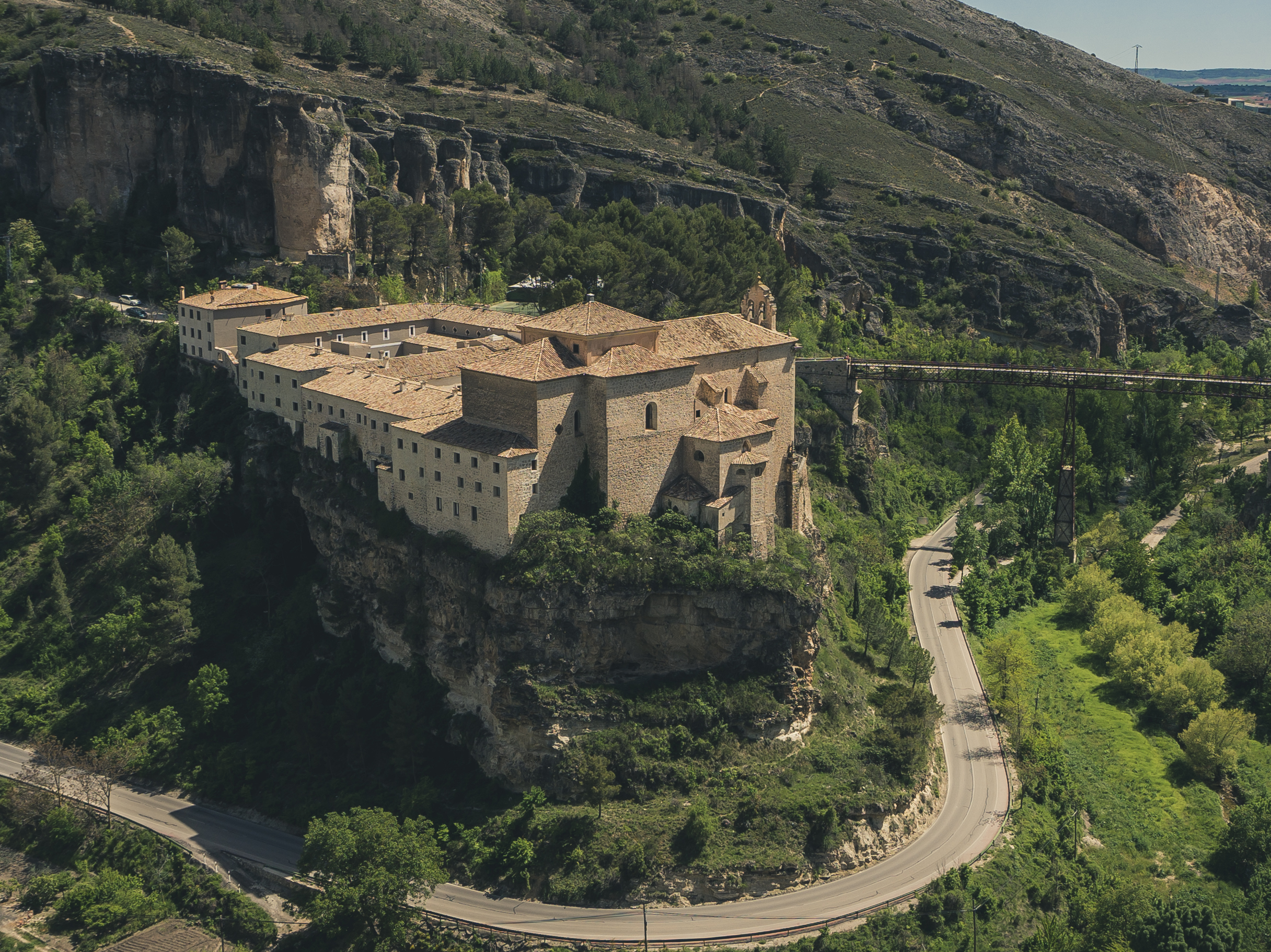
- Interactive map of the Convent of San Pablo area
- Alternative names: Parador de Cuenca
- Hotel chain: Paradores

General information
- Status: Active
- Type: Convent
- Location: Cuenca, Spain

Website
- Parador de Cuenca

Spanish Cultural Heritage
- Official name: Convento de San Pablo
- Type: Non-movable
- Criteria: Monument
- Designated: 31 October 2006
- Reference no.: RI-51-0011387

The Convent of San Pablo is a sixteenth century former convent in Cuenca, Spain, that belonged to the Dominican Order. It stands on a promontory over the Huécar river facing the Hanging Houses. The church was finished in the eighteenth century, in rococo style. Since 1993 it houses a state-owned Parador hotel.
