= Castle of Zafra (Badajoz) =

Building in Zafra, Badajoz, Spain

Palace of the Dukes of Feria
- Palacio de los Duques de Feria
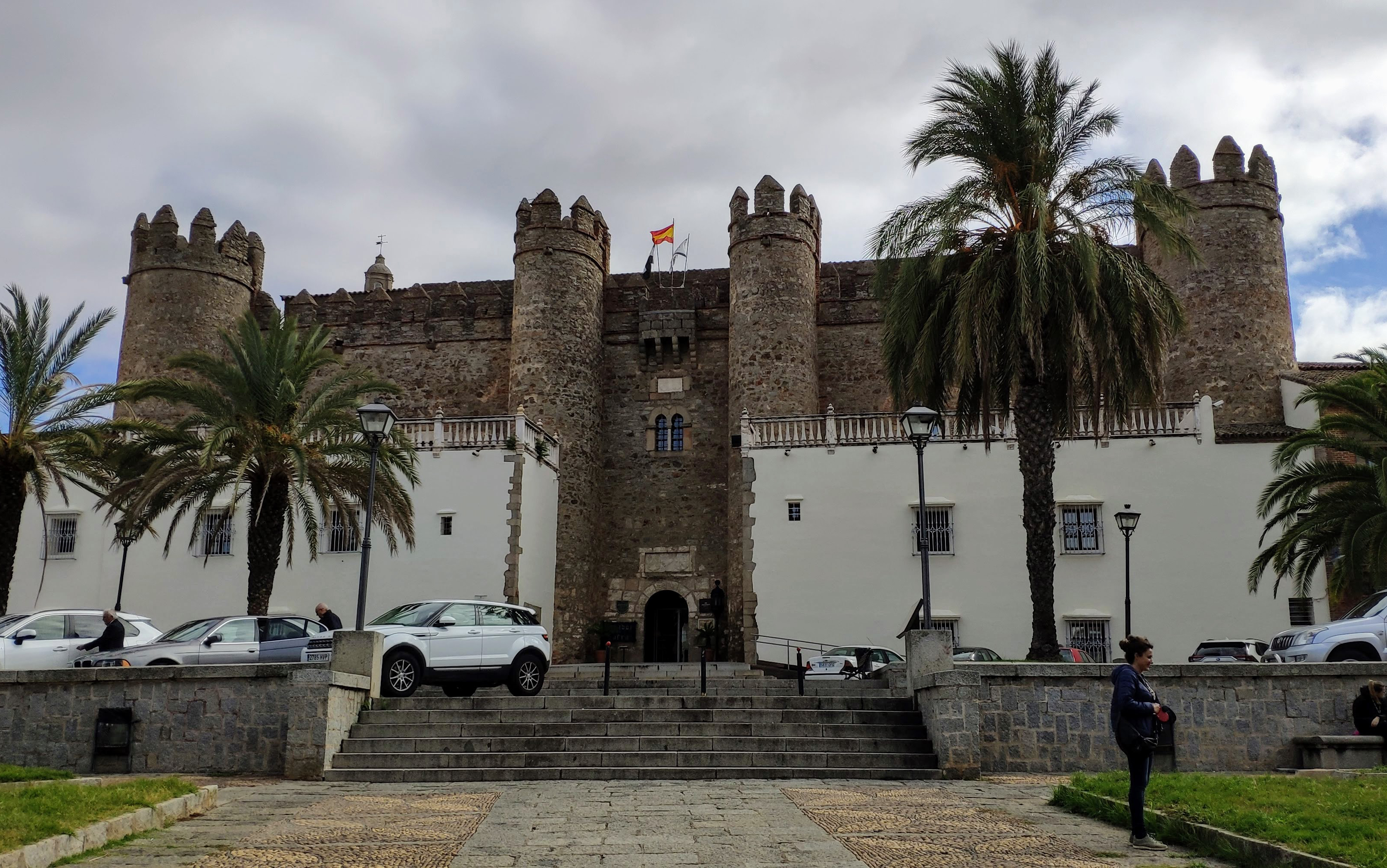
- Interactive map of the Palace of the Dukes of Feria area
- Alternative names: Parador de Zafra
- Hotel chain: Paradores

General information
- Location: Zafra (Badajoz), Spain
- Completed: 1443

Website
- Parador de Zafra

The Palace of the Dukes of Feria (Spanish: Palacio de los Duques de Feria) or the Castle of Zafra is a Gothic castle in Zafra, Badajoz, Spain, built between 1437 and 1443. On June 3, 1931, during the Second Spanish Republic, it was declared a historical-artistic monument belonging to the National Treasury.
