= Bernard of Sédirac =

Medieval archbishop of Toledo and first primate of Spain

Bernard of Sédirac (c. 1050 – 1125), also known as Bernard of Le Sauvetat, was the metropolitan archbishop of Toledo from 1086 and first primate of Spain from 1088 to his death. His significance in the history of Spain lies in the fact that during his episcopate the church of Castile and León emerges from its isolation. He is often confused with Bernard of Agen, first bishop of Sigüenza, who was also a Gascon and Cluniac monk.

He was born in Gascony around 1050, at La Sauvetat de Blanquefort (Lot-et-Garonne), near the town of Agen. It is thought he belonged to the ancient family of the viscounts of Sédirac (also spelled Sédilhac), whose castle, southwest of La Sauvetat, still stands. An illness forced Bernard to turn away from a military career and instead enter the monastic life.

He became a monk in the Abbey of Cluny, whence he was sent to Spain with others to assist the cause of the reforms of Gregory VII. Here he was made (1080) abbot of St. Facundus at Sahagún in the diocese of León, and finally named for the archbishopric of Toledo by Alfonso VI of Castile, the great patron of Cluny.

Gregory's plans for Spain included (besides a general crusade against clerical marriage, simony, and lay investiture) the substitution of the Roman liturgy for the Mozarabic and pressure for recognition of obligations of tribute from the Spanish church. The former point had been practically gained before his death, in spite of strenuous opposition. Urban II, by raising Bernard's see to primatial dignity, gave him the power necessary to prosecute the work of Romanizing. His cooperation made possible Urban's intervention at the Synod of León (1091) and ignoring of the royal right of investiture when Alfonso attempted to appoint a Castilian to the see of Santiago de Compostela, apparently in order to counterbalance the influence of the Cluniac Benedictines with whom the archbishop was filling the episcopal sees.

His career was throughout that of a devoted adherent of the papacy. Some reminiscences of his youthful days as a knight appear in his forcible seizure of the mosque at Toledo in his first year as archbishop and in his plans for a crusade against the Saracens of the East, which both Urban II and Paschal II forbade in view of the tasks which Spanish Christian knighthood faced at home.

Four of his sermons, on the Salve Regina, are included among those of the great Bernard of Clairvaux. He was satirized in the 11th-century work, The Treatise of Garcia of Toledo, said to have been written by one of his canons.
