= Parador =

Kind of luxury hotel in Spanish-speaking countries

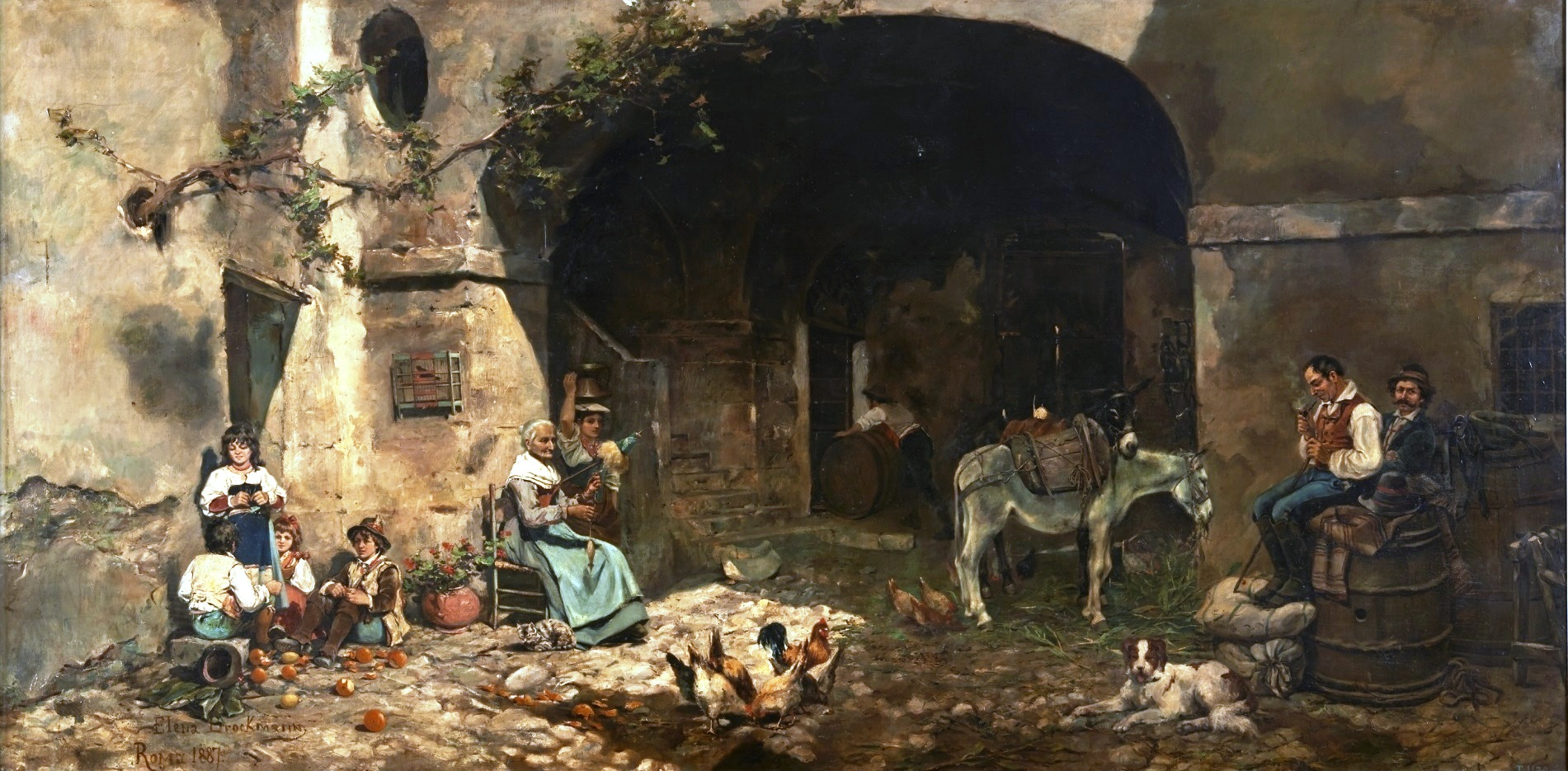
The patio of a parador (1887) by Elena Brockmann. San Telmo Museoa

A parador (Spanish pronunciation: [paɾaˈðoɾ]), in Spain and other Spanish-speaking countries was an establishment where travelers could seek lodging, and usually, food and drink, similar to an inn. In Spain since 1928, a Parador is a state-owned luxury hotel, usually located in a converted historic building such as a monastery or castle, or in a place of natural beauty.

Paradores de Puerto Rico is a brand of small inns, similar to bed and breakfasts, that have government permission to call themselves paradores based on a set of criteria. In Argentina, Uruguay, Paraguay and Chile, a small number of estancias, particularly those with historic architecture, have been converted into guest ranches called paradores.

Parar means to stop, halt or stay in Spanish.

== Paradores de Turismo de España ==
Paradores de Turismo de España, branded as Paradores, is a Spanish state-owned chain of luxury hotels that are usually located in historic buildings or in modern buildings in nature areas with a special appeal or with panoramic views of historical and monumental cities. The company was created with the double objective of promoting tourism in areas that lacked adequate accommodations, and of putting unused large historic buildings to use, for the maintenance of the national heritage. Along its history, the establishments of its network have been branded as Parador, Parador Nacional, Parador de Turismo or Parador Nacional de Turismo in different times. Its first Parador was inaugurated by King Alfonso XIII on 9 October 1928 in Navarredonda de Gredos (Ávila) and was purpose–built. The first Parador to be converted from a historic building was the Parador de Oropesa, opened in 1930. The Hostal de los Reyes Catolicos in Santiago de Compostela, one of the oldest continuously operating hotels in the world, is the finest and the largest by capacity Parador. This state-run network has been profitable and operates ninety-eight Paradores as of 2022.

The Portuguese equivalent, the Pousadas de Portugal, were founded in 1941, after the Spanish model.

== Paradores de Puerto Rico ==
The Puerto Rico Tourism Company was established during the early 1970s under the administration of Governor Luis A. Ferre, who wanted to enhance the tourism sector of the island. The company runs an enterprise known as Paradores de Puerto Rico; these are typically small, one-of-a-kind, locally owned and operated hotels located in rural areas throughout the island commonwealth. They are frequented by guests looking to enjoy the local customs and charm. Often called "country inns" in English, Paradores de Puerto Rico are usually located in rural areas.

To be part of the Paradores de Puerto Rico Program, the hotel must meet certain standards set by the Puerto Rico Tourism Company. These include being located outside the San Juan metro area (most of them are located on the west coast or in the mountains), having 15 to 75 rooms, having a restaurant on site or nearby, and being family-owned and operated.

== See also ==
- List of hotels in Spain
- List of hotels in Puerto Rico
