= Parador de Oropesa =

Hotel in Spain

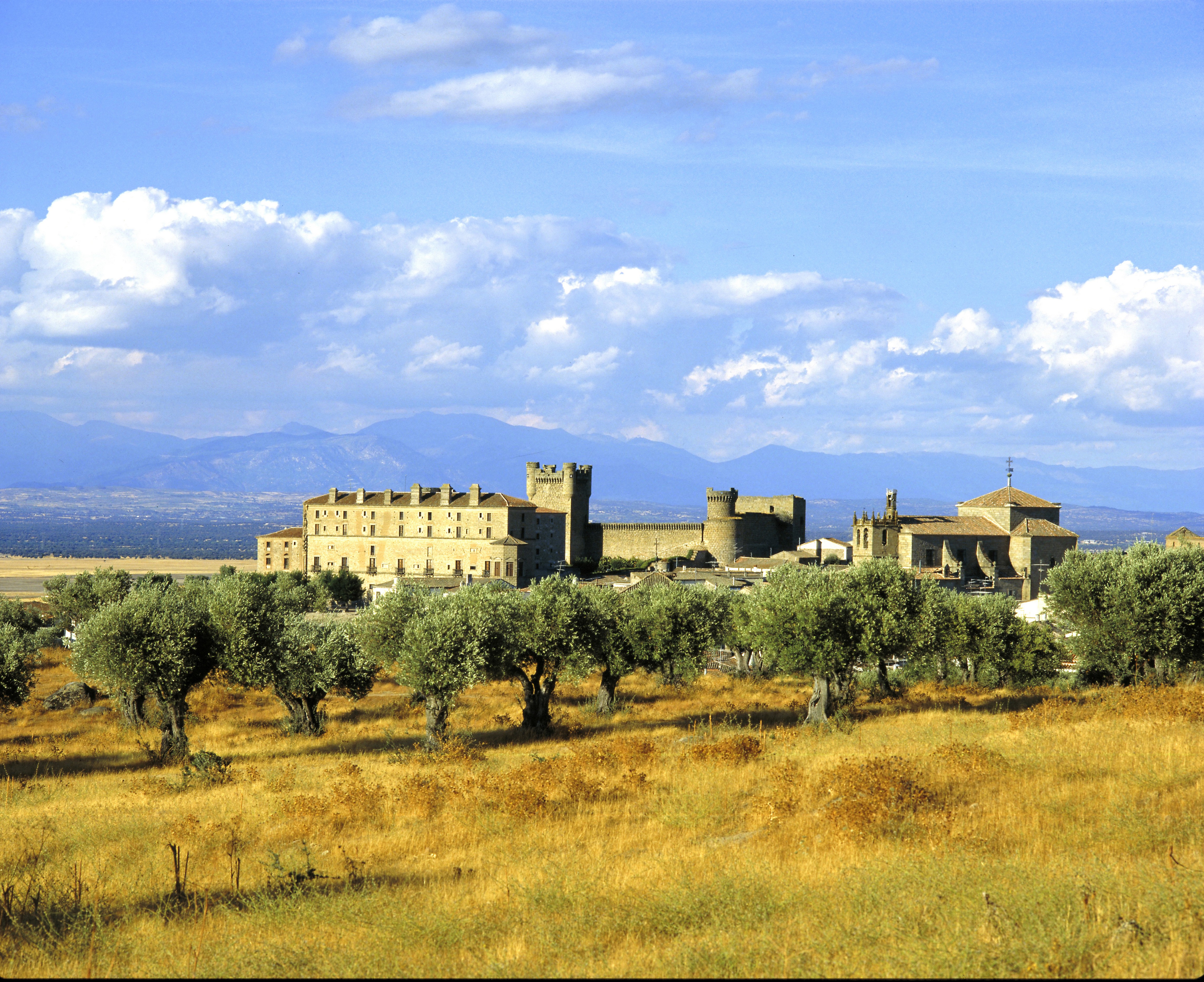
- Interactive map of the Parador de Oropesa area
- Alternative names: Palacio Doña Elvira; Palacio de los Álverez de Toledo; Virrey de Toledo
- Hotel chain: Paradores

General information
- Type: Palaces converted to hotel
- Architectural style: Mudéjar-Gothic; Rencimiento Español (Spanish Renaissance)
- Location: Plaza Palacio, 1, 45560, Oropesa, Toledo, Oropesa (Province of Toledo), Spain
- Year built: c1399–2016
- Opened: 7 February 1930
- Inaugurated: 11 March 1930

Design and construction
- Architects: Juan de Herrera; Francisco de Mora

Renovating team
- Architects: Luis Martinez Feduchi Ruíz; Julián Luís Manzano Monís; Carlos Fernández-Cuenca Gómez; Mauro Cano

Website
- Parador de Oropesa

The Parador de Oropesa, also known as Virrey de Toledo, is a four-star Parador hotel located in the town of Oropesa, in the province of Toledo, in the autonomous community of Castile-La Mancha, Spain. It was converted over a number of years from two of the buildings forming the compound of the Castillo de Oropesa (Oropesa Castle). The Parador is located both in the Palacio Viejo (Old Palace), also known as the Palacio Doña Elvira, which dates from the end of the 14th century, and in the Palacio Nuevo (Oropesa) (New Palace), also known as the Palacio de los Álvarez de Toledo, which was built in the 16th century.

The two palaces were the residence of the Condado de Oropesa (Counts of Oropesa), part of the noble family of the Casa de Toledo (House of Toledo). The family died out in the early 19th century and the castle and palaces were inherited by the Duque de Frías (Dukes of Frías). In the early 20th century the buildings passed into public ownership, serving as a school, housing for the Guardia Civil (Civil Guard), a theatre, the municipal slaughterhouse, and storage for grain, while the central courtyard served as a bullring and as a location for local entertainment and festivities.

In 1929 part of the New Palace was converted into one of the earliest Paradores, the first to be constructed within a pre-existing historical building, with nine bedrooms and space for 19 guests. Much expanded since, into both the New and Old Palaces, it is now one of the most popular venues in the Parador chain.

== The original buildings and their early history ==
The Parador de Oropesa is established within the complex of the castle of Oropesa. The castle complex consists of four attached major buildings: two castles and two palaces, together known as the Palacio Condal (Comital Palace). The Castillo Viejo (Old Castle) or Patio Musulmán (Muslim Courtyard) dates from the 12th and 13th centuries and the Castillo Nuevo (New Castle) from the 14th and 15th centuries. The Parador is situated in the two palaces, the Palacio Viejo (Old Palace) of the 15th century, and the Palacio Nuevo (New Palace) built in the 16th century.

=== Beginnings ===
The castle at Oropesa was built first as a watchtower on a hilltop to control the transit of livestock. It was built by the Vettones, an Iron Age pre-Roman people of the Iberian Peninsula. Later the Romans built another tower there to control the road they had built between the cities of Toledo and Mérida. They also built an inn to serve travellers, provide horse supplies and house military detachments. The Muslim occupation of Iberia, begun in the year 711, saw the building of a much larger fortress on the remains of the ancient Roman castellum. Two circular towers of Arab origin remain as part of the later fortifications.

=== Crown ownership ===
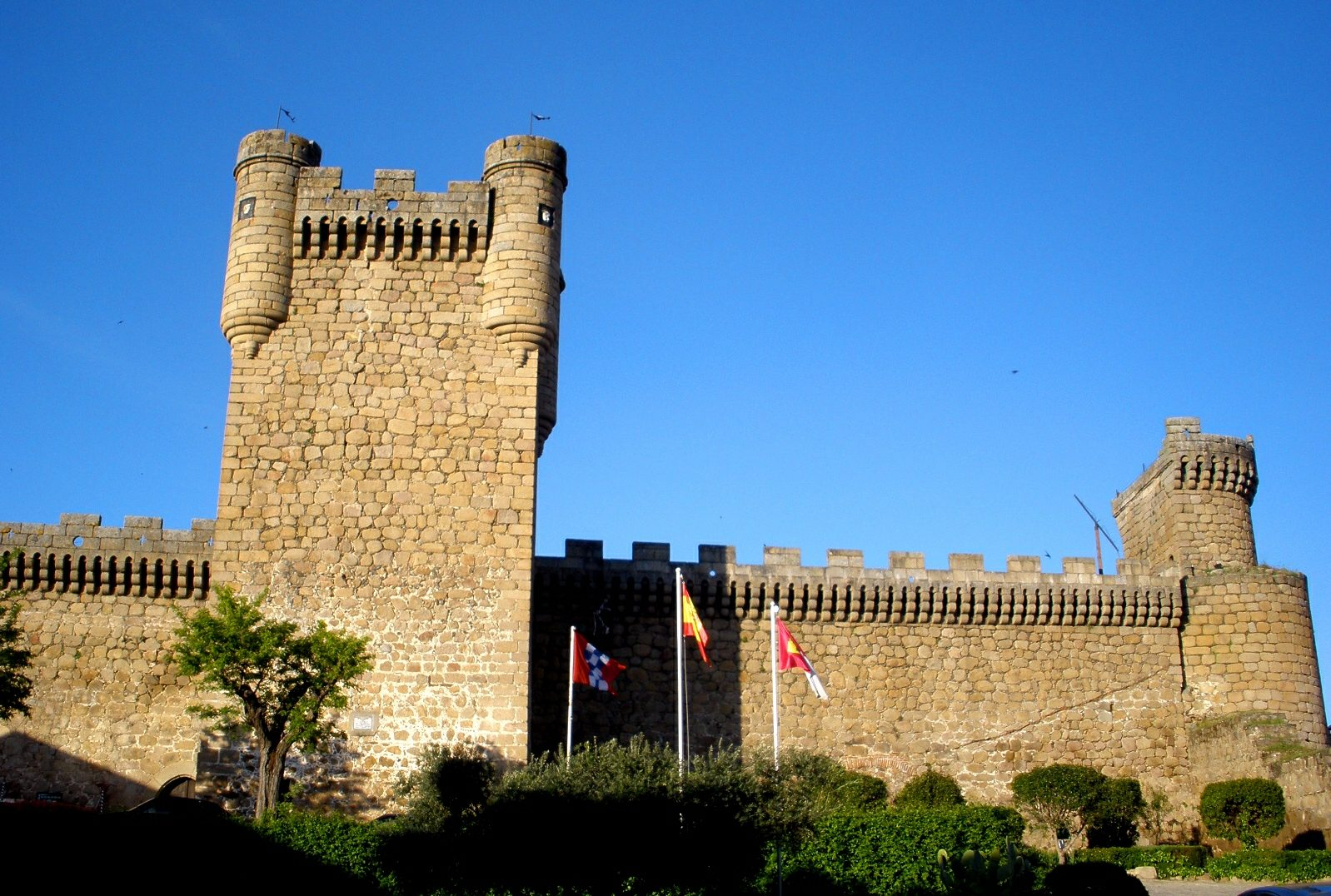
Oropesa Castle in the present day

King Alfonso VI de León y Castilla captured Toledo in 1085. Oropesa and the Muslim-built castle came under his control. His descendant Alfonso X de Castilla gifted the town to its citizens, and Alfonso's son, Juan de Castilla rewarded the Oropesa nobles for their loyalty with further fortifications and the building of a town wall in 1321. In 1366 Enrique II de Castilla granted the lordship of Oropesa to García Álvarez de Toledo as a reward for supporting him in the war against Pedro el Cruel.

=== Aristocratic ownership and the first palace ===
García Álvarez de Toledo's son, Fernán Álvarez de Toledo y Zúñiga, the second lord of Oropesa, with his wife Elvira de Ayala, lady of Cebolla, built the first palace and enlarged the castle at the end of the 14th century. This palace, on the north side of the castle complex and abutting the castle, is a Mudéjar-Gothic building with a long hall room on the upper floor approached from the courtyard by a wide stone interior staircase. The hall was embellished by a polychrome wooden coffered ceiling decorated with the coat of arms of the Álvarez de Toledo family and those of other families connected by marriage. A mirador (lookout point) was built onto the hall, as an internal balcony or loggia open to the air with four foliated Gothic arches. The exterior arch spandrels displayed three coats of arms, one being of the Álvarez family and the other two of the Zúñiga family. Plateresque details were added to the first palace in the 16th century.

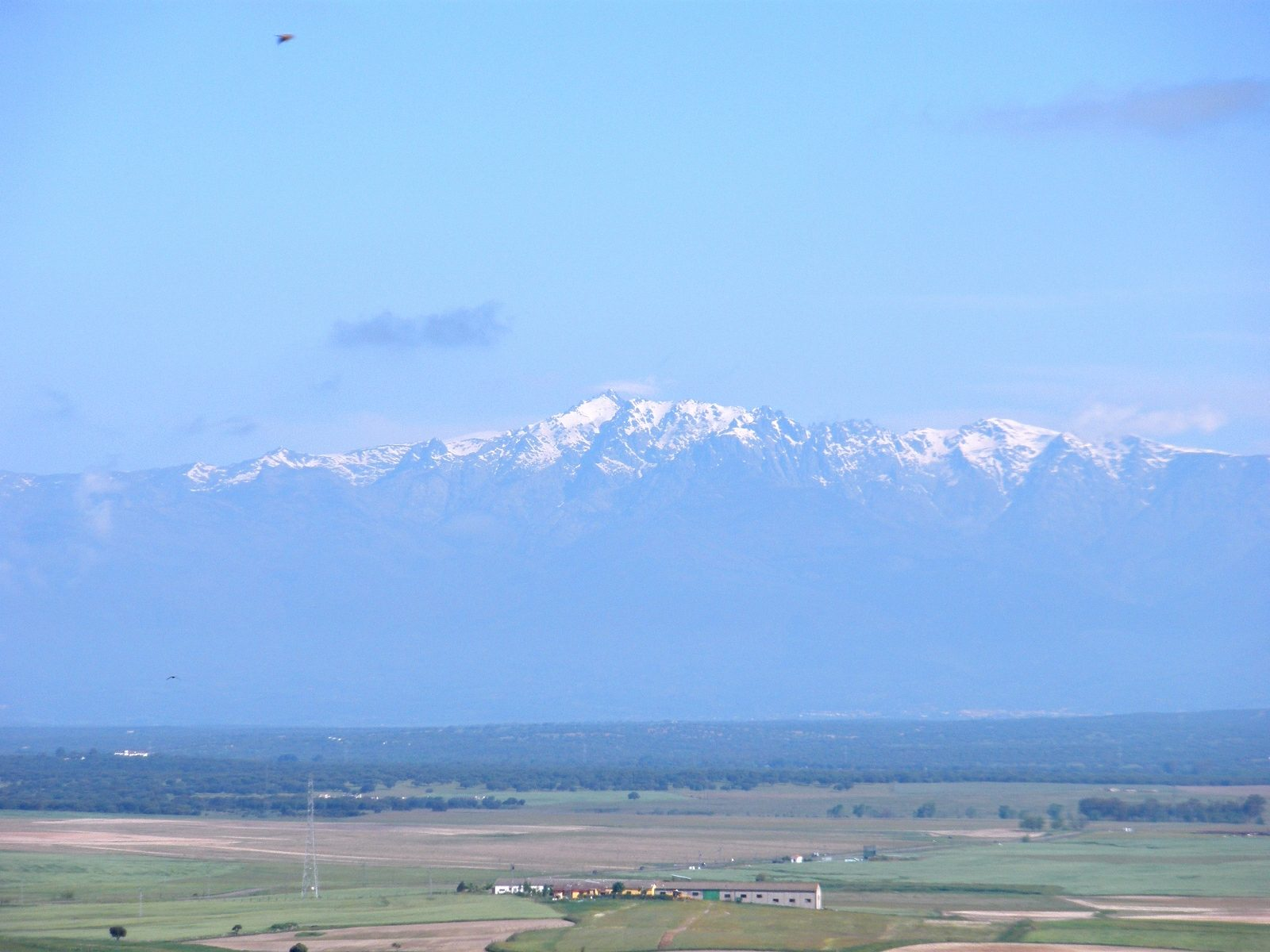
The Sierra de Gredos viewed from the Mirador de Doña Elvira

The building came to be known as the Palacio Doña Elvira and the viewpoint as the Mirador de Doña Elvira. The front of the building, and the viewpoint, faces the northwest and looks over the extensive flat valley of the Rio Tiétar, which flows through the Campo Arañuelo, and beyond that the fertile foothills of La Vera and the Sierra de Gredos.

In 1477 the Álvarez de Toledo male line was elevated from lords to counts by Isabel la Católica as thanks for Álvarez support in the War of the Castilian Succession against Afonso V of Portugal. They became the Condado de Oropesa (Counts of Oropesa).

=== The New Palace ===
In the 16th century, the Counts of Oropesa built the New Palace. There is a difference of opinion as to whether the architect was Juan de Herrera (1530-1597) or his closest disciple Francisco de Mora (1552-1610). They are known to have worked together on a number of prominent Spanish buildings, including the Alcázar of Segovia and El Escorial, so it is possible they collaborated in the design of the New Palace.

Grander than the Old Palace, this building was designed in the style of the Renacimiento Español (Spanish Renaissance). Situated roughly at right-angles to the Old Palace it faced west-southwest. The main façade was elongated, symmetrical, predominantly flat and unusually high. Built of stone with occasional red brick infill, two full length stone belt courses divided the façade horizontally into three sections. Internally there were three floors with mezzanines, producing some peculiarities in the fenestration pattern. Most prominently, there were seven wrought-iron balconies, served by full-height glazed doors, in a row above the first of the stone string courses. The balconies retain their original metalwork. All the windows were framed with plain, monumental dressed stone and capped by red brick arches.

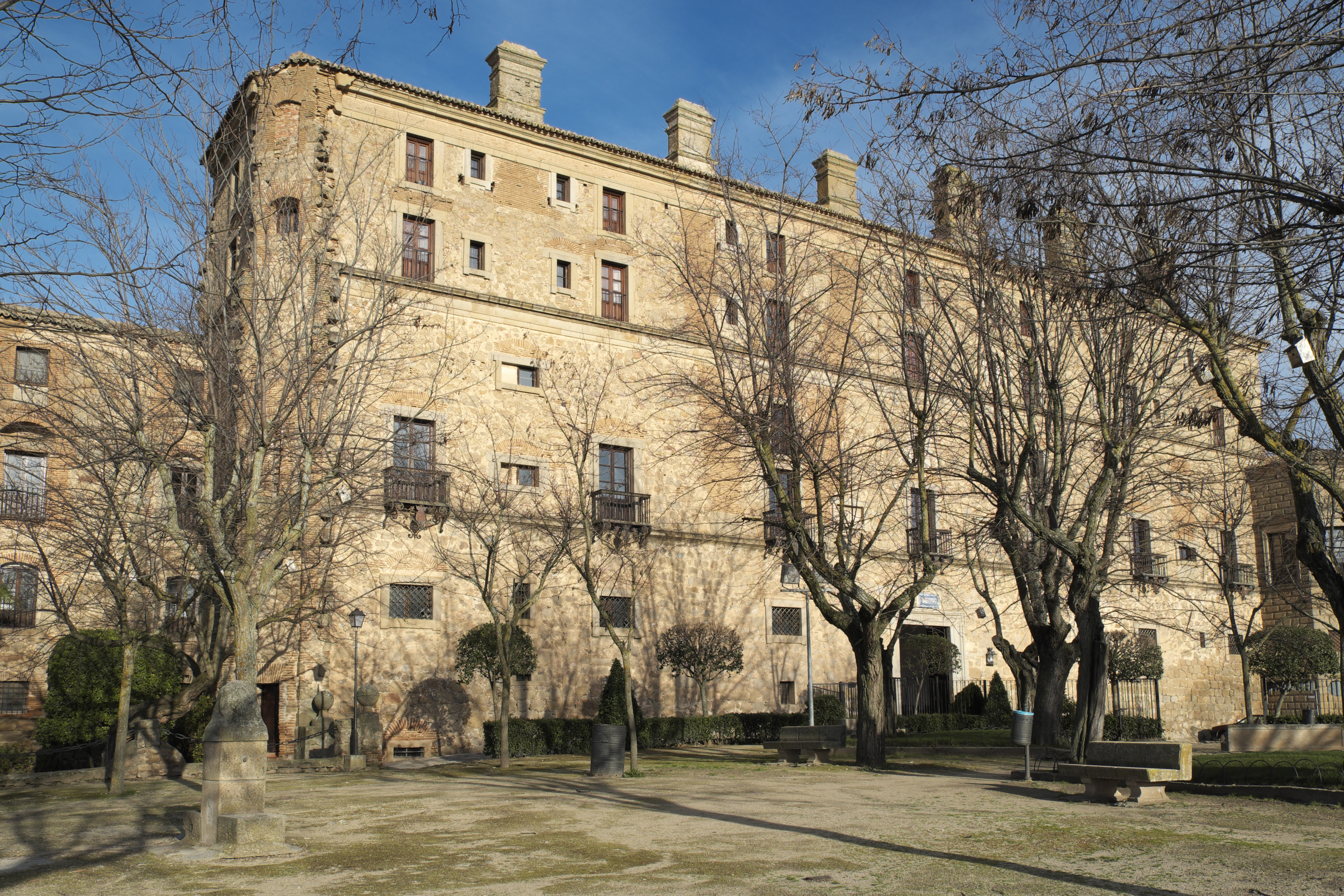
The front of the New Palace in 2013

At roof level six large rectilinear chimneys were visually situated above and between the seven vertical window alignments. To the right of the façade was an octagonal ground-based structure of two double-height storeys to the height of the second belt course. It was built of padded ashlar stone and the second storey featured large windows crowned by triangular pediments on each of the seven faces. The eighth face connected with the southern corner of the main building. The upper storey was known as El Peinador de la Duquesa (the Duchess's dressing room). Unfinished stonework on the northern corner of the palace shows that a similar matching structure was to have been built there. The main entrance of the New Palace was centred in the building. Wide enough for a carriage, it led straight through the ground floor of the palace into the courtyard in front of the castle.

The rear of the New Palace, facing the castle, had none of the symmetry or style of the frontal façade. It was more complex in presentation, with a number of blocks of differing dimensions projecting eastwards, and northwards to connect with the western end of the Old Palace. Some of the windows on the rear side are framed with red brick, with brick fans forming the lintel. Others are surrounded with plain dressed stone in a similar way to the windows on the façade.

To the south of the New Palace a further wing projected eastward, reached by a corridor extended from the gallery behind the New Palace. It housed a church where the counts and their families worshipped from a private gallery. This wing also contained service areas including kitchens, staff bedrooms, haylofts and stables. It has since been demolished.

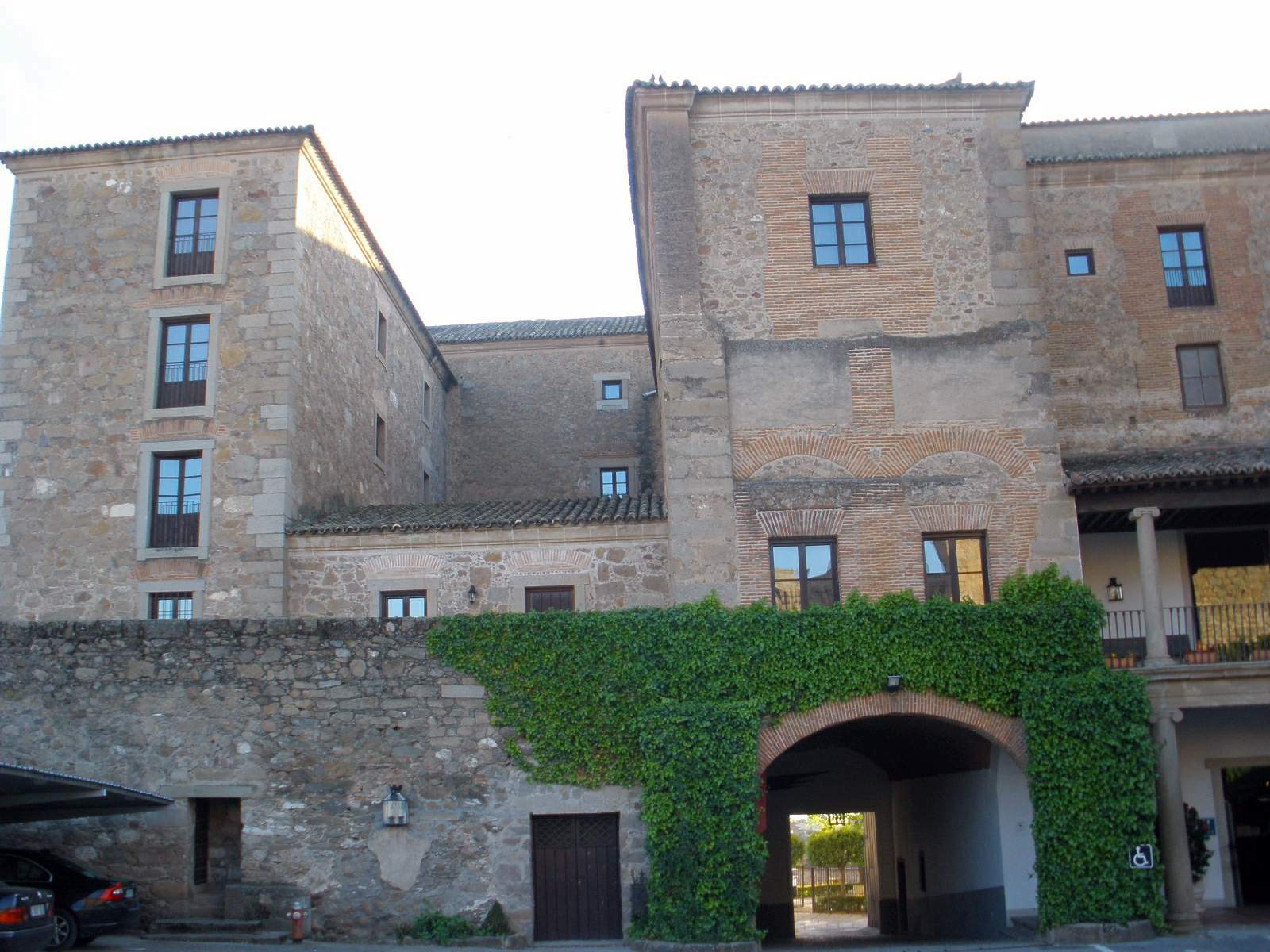
Part of the rear of the New Palace in 2017

The rear of the New and Old Palaces had an L-shaped double-height open gallery, supported by 32 Ionic stone columns, facing onto the courtyard. At the central corner of the gallery the Old Palace's semi-exterior staircase emerged at the upper level, having risen from the ground floor at the rear of the New Palace. The gallery gave its name to the central courtyard which became known as el patio de las galerías.

Internally, the New Palace was laid out in a similar way to most aristocratic houses of the time, with interconnecting rooms in a corridor formation, allowing visual communication from one end of the building to the other, both on the floor housing the reception and ceremonial rooms, and on the floors above housing the bedrooms. On the first floor above the ground floor a large room, built as an apothecary, was the transitional space between the Old and New Palaces. Just off it was a medieval tower dating from the Arab period which became part of the palatial complex when the two palaces were conjoined.

Some unfinished external construction areas show the New Palace remained incomplete, though occasional building improvements and changes were carried out over subsequent years. The 5th Count of Oropesa, some time after 1619, began an elevated walkway into the town from the New Palace. A series of brick arches was built, leading to the parish Church of Our Lady of the Assumption, so the countess and her suite could leave the palace and attend mass without having to mix with townspeople. On the count's death in 1621 the project was unfinished and remained that way as the widowed countess abandoned Oropesa for the court in Madrid.

For nearly another 200 years the castle and palaces remained in the hands of the Álvarez family. Over four centuries the family had hosted celebrated figures at the palace, including Carlos I of Spain, later Holy Roman Emperor, and San Pedro de Alcántara, whose cell has been preserved by the Parador. The involvement of the Counts of Oropesa in political and military activities established the castle as an important centre of support and at other times of resistance. In 1808 the castle and palaces were sacked by French troops during the Peninsular War.

At the beginning of the 19th century the lineage of Álvarez de Toledo died out and the lordship passed to the citizens of Oropesa. Soon after, the Duques de Frías, who claimed descent from the Counts of Oropesa, succeeded in taking over the castle. The new nobles found the palace to be in a very dilapidated condition. The last aristocratic owner of the complex was José Bernardino Fernández de Velasco, the fifteenth Duque de Frías. On the duke's death in 1888 the castle and palaces, still in poor condition, were sold to Enrique Gutiérrez de Salamanca and Ruffo de Gambert, who raised mortgages on the two palaces in order to buy them.

== Castle and palaces under the ownership of Oropesa ==
At the beginning of the 20th century the owners of the castle and palaces at Oropesa, Enrique Gutiérrez de Salamanca and Ruffo de Gambert, had defaulted on their mortgages and the properties were acquired by the Oropesa ayuntiamento (town council).

Under the town's control the castle and palaces became the community centre. Rooms in the Old Palace were converted into offices. The local Guardia Civil (Civil Guard) station was located in the main hall of the Old Palace, the loggia viewpoint being bricked in and given some small windows. Below the Guardia Civil, on the ground floor of the Old Palace, was the municipal theatre. The New Palace housed the Oropesa escuela de primer grado (primary school) and homes for the teachers. The town council secretary and the building superintendent also lived in the New Palace. Some of the lower rooms were used as the municipal slaughterhouse and as food stores.

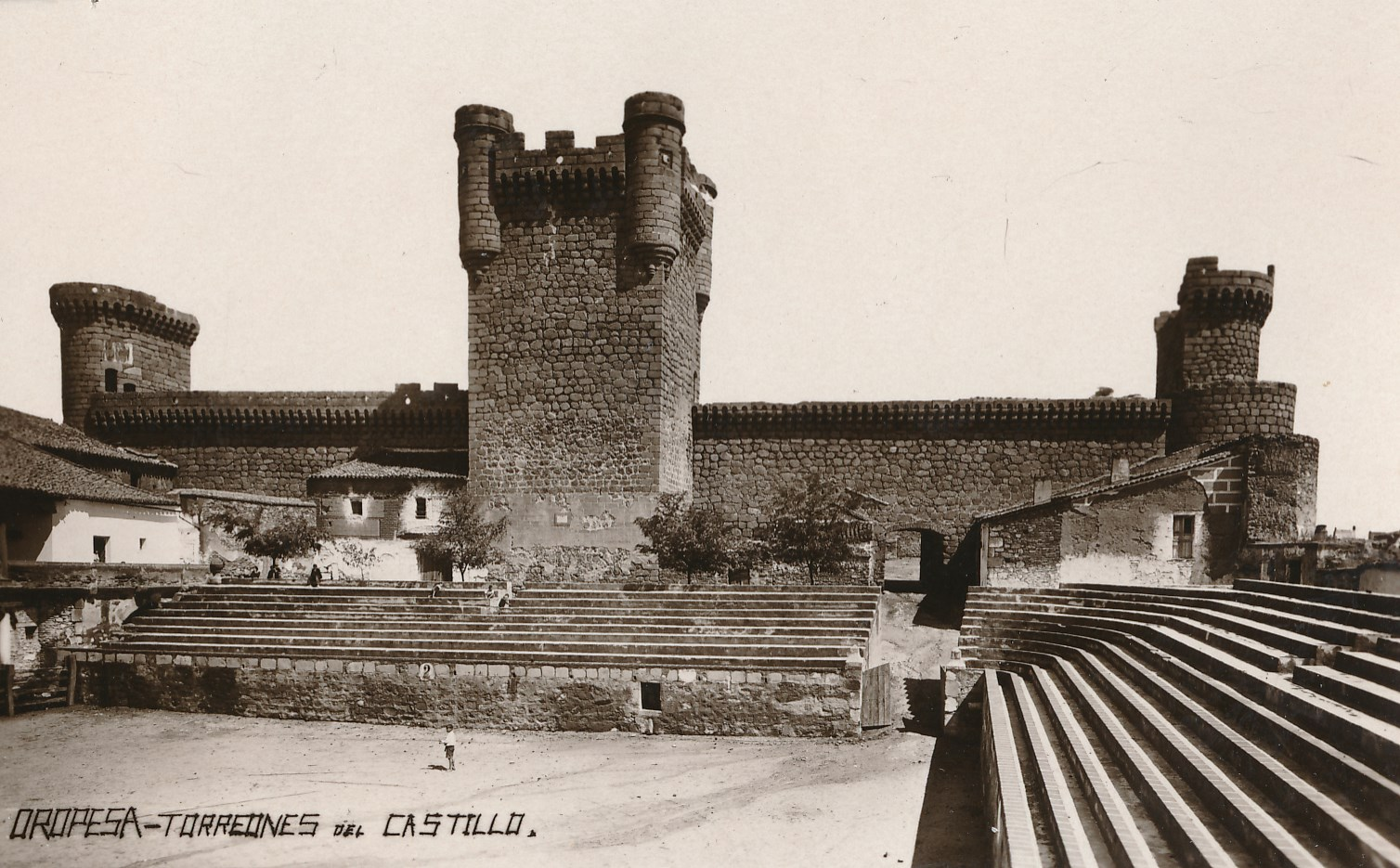
Oropesa Castle and the courtyard bleachers in the 1930s

In 1928 a bullring was installed in the courtyard with permanent concrete bleachers for the spectators built on the southern and eastern sides. The gallery on the northern and western sides, with the temporary addition of bleachers beneath when a fight was planned, completed the ring. The bullfighters, who came mostly from local villages, were usually second-rate.

The castle was declared a Monumento-Artistico (Artistic Monument) on 8 February 1923, and a Monumento Nacional (National Monument) in 1926.

== Conversion to a Parador ==
The Parador de Oropesa was the first of the then fledgling Parador chain to be converted from an historic building, being inaugurated in February 1930. Many more Parador adaptations of ancient structures were to follow. The initiative for its conversion came from Platón Páramo Sánchez-Junquera (1857–1929), a local apothecary, collector and antique dealer, who as well as holding other political positions was a member of the Provincial Board of Tourism.

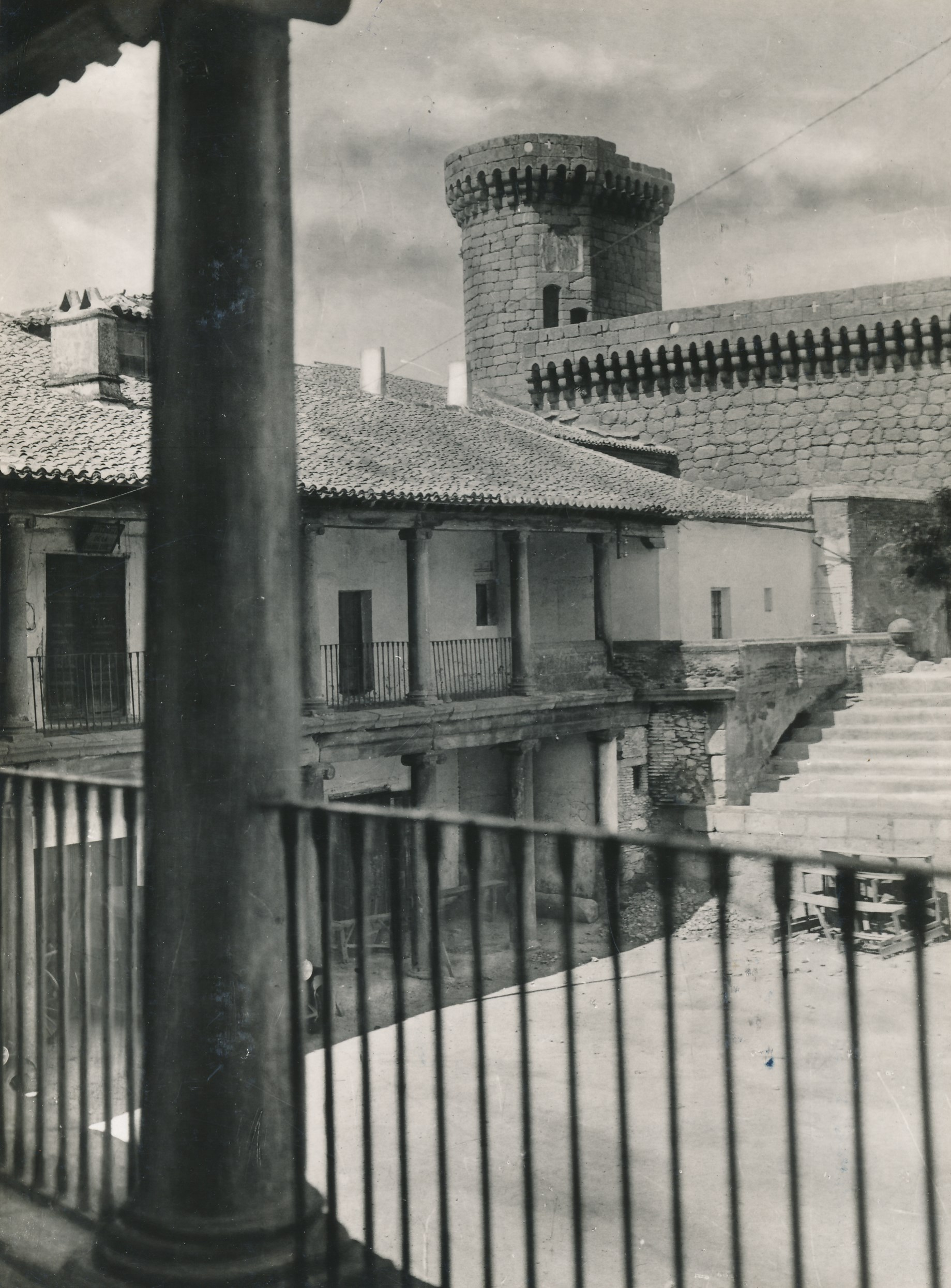
Part of the gallery and courtyard in the 1930s

In November 1928, the new Junta de Paradores y Hosterías del Reino requested the help of the Oropesa town council, who owned the Palace, in the conversion and inauguration of the Parador, in particular in the task of ceding to the Junta de Paradores (rent free and for 20 years) all the rooms on the first floor of the New Palace required for the conversion. The council was to continue its housing of teachers, the school, the Civil Guard and other municipal offices in other parts of the property for over three decades until the expansion of the Parador in the 1960s.

The architect instructed to take on the conversion project was Madrid-born Luis Martinez Feduchi Ruíz (1901–1975), who was then in his late twenties, having graduated from the Escuela Técnica Superior de Arquitectura de Madrid (Higher Technical School of Architecture of Madrid) in 1927. The Parador de Oropesa was one of his first works, carried out at speed, and with building restoration and the determination to create a hotel taking precedent over any necessity for the conservation of heritage. He not only designed the building conversion but also took charge of the interior decorating, designing much of the furniture and fittings himself. A few of these remain in the Parador. The adaptation was completed in November 1929. On 7 February 1930 the Parador de Turismo de Oropesa entered into service, with its official inauguration taking place on 11 March 1930.

== The Parador in operation before the Spanish Civil War ==
When the Parador de Oropesa opened it was seen as a revolution in terms of tourism, but also it created a new type of employment in an area which was mostly dependent on agricultural work.

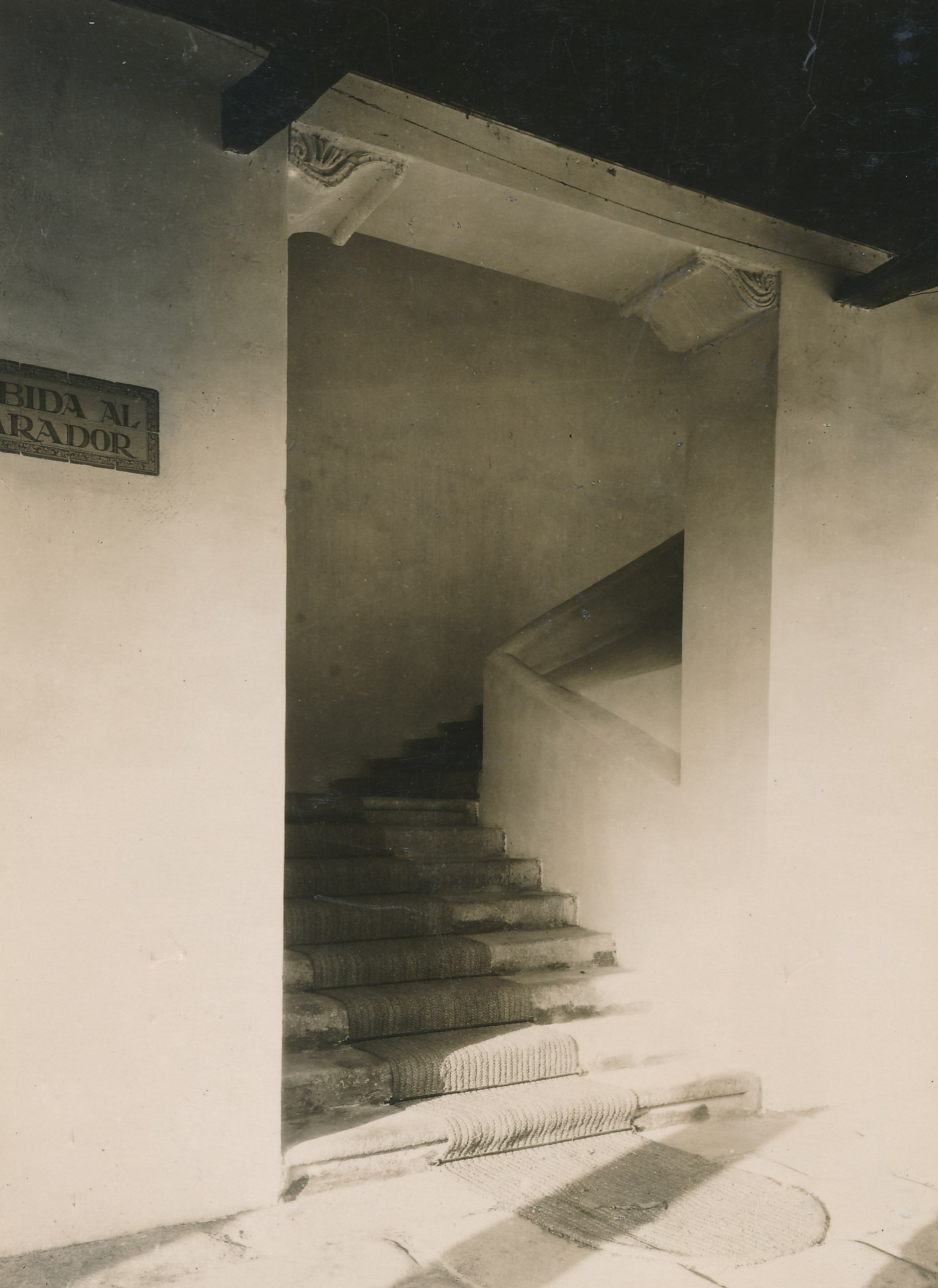
Staircase to the Parador entrance in the 1930s

The Oropesa Parador's administrator was Adela Páramo Cuartero, the daughter of the main instigator of the project. She had brought in some of her own antique furniture pieces to help decorate the interior. She retained her ownership of these pieces and when she retired in 1965 she took much of the furniture away with her. Under her command in 1930 were a cook, two waitresses, three cleaners and a guard. The majority of the staff were residents of the town, but they usually spent the night in the staff dormitories. The hours were long: often from eight o'clock in the morning to midnight. The Parador had a vegetable garden to serve the restaurant along with yards for keeping smaller animals for the same purpose. On the occasions when the well dried up water had to be trucked in. The guard shouldered these responsibilities as well as carrying the coal for fires for heating and for the ovens.

Access to the Parador was through the archway from the street to the inner courtyard and then by a semi-exterior staircase to the gallery of the main floor where there was access to the lobby. The gallery shared access to the barracks of the Civil Guard, who occupied the first floor of the Old Palace. The Parador also shared its location with the school and accommodation for teachers.

The interior of the Parador combined comfort with an aristocratic ambience typical of the region. There were five double guest rooms, three of them with a bathroom en suite, another bathroom for use by guests without en suite facilities, a bedroom for drivers, a room for the manager, another for the workers, an office, a service room and a dining room able to seat 30 guests. The old municipal theatre on the ground floor was converted into garages for cars.

Full board at the Parador was 20 to 25 pesetas and a few pesetas extra for room with a bathroom. Breakfast was 2 pesetas, lunch 8 pesetas and dinner 10 pesetas. A cup of coffee was 75 centimos.

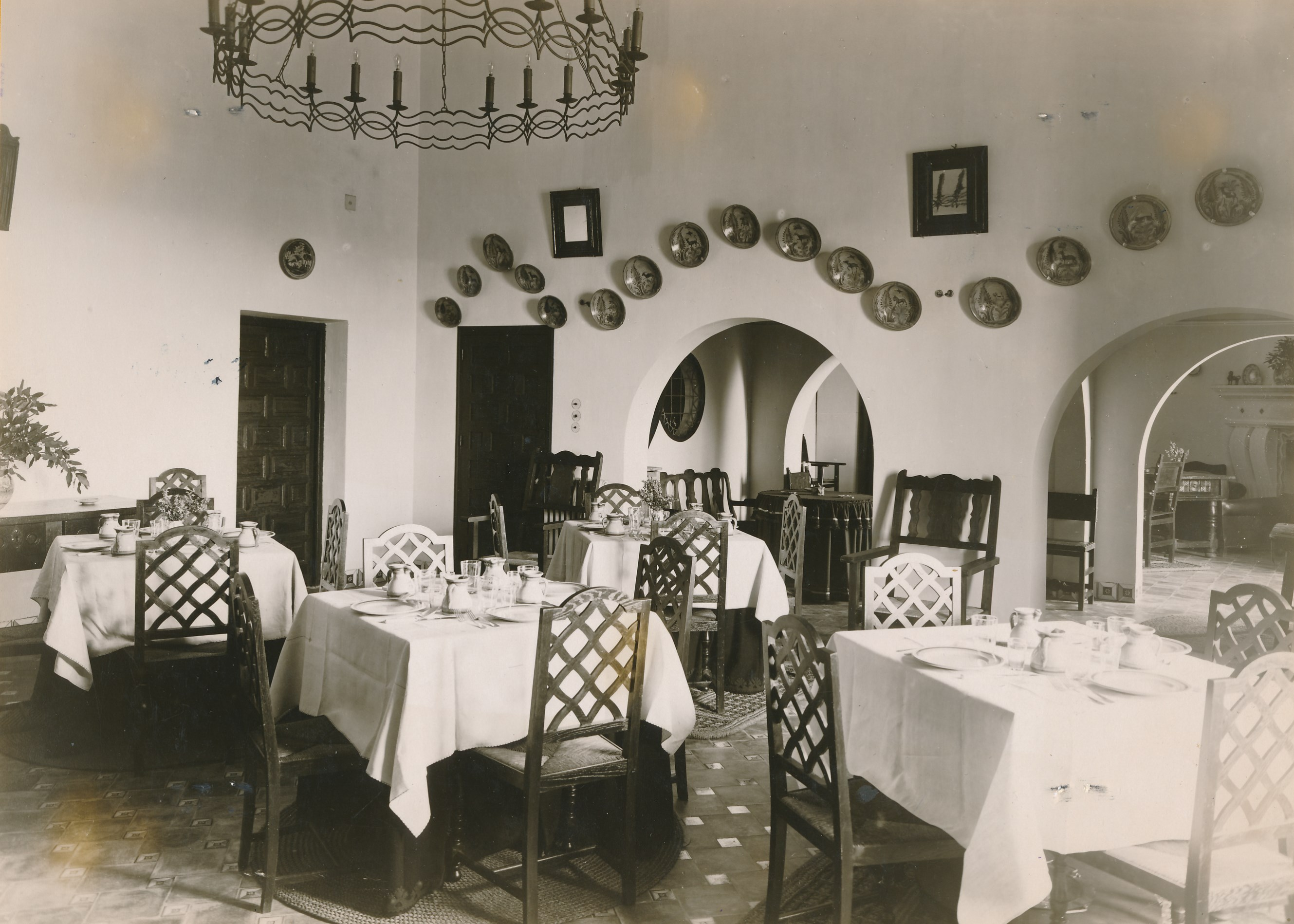
The dining room in the 1930s

Business at the Parador was slow at first; four days might pass without the arrival of a guest. In 1931 there were 20 overnight stays and 45 meals were served.

King Alfonso XIII visited the Parador de Oropesa on 18 November 1930 and addressed the residents of the town from the central first floor balcony of the New Palace, over the entrance archway. Journalists reported that he was "applauded enthusiastically".

Other visitors to the Parador de Oropesa in the 1930s included a number of British authors, such as Gerald Brenan, Graham Greene and W Somerset Maugham.

The Parador continued in operation until the early months of the Spanish Civil War.

== The Spanish Civil War, 1936-1939 ==
On the outbreak of the Spanish Civil War fought between the Republicans and the Nationalists in July 1936 the working of the Parador continued briefly until the government (Republican) military command of the Extremadura army (First Organic Division) with troops from Madrid and led by General José Riquelme y López Bago. took over the castle and the Parador as a base for their local operations.

Within the town and the surrounding countryside there was considerable support for the Republic amongst working people while more prosperous members of the community, landowners, and priests supported the rebel Nacionales. There was much hatred between the Republicans and Nationalists in Oropesa which resulted in "horrific cruelties" in the town and elsewhere.

By the end of August 1936 Oropesa castle was threatened by Nationalist forces, composed of members of the Ejérciot de África (Army of Africa) led by Lieutenant Colonel Juan Yagüe. These militia, mostly members of the Spanish Legion and Moroccan Regulares (Regulars), backed by Andalusian Requeté (paramilitaries), were commanded by Lieutenant Colonel Heli Rolando de Tella y Cantos and had made a remarkably rapid advance north through Extremadura before turning north-eastwards towards Toledo and Madrid. Oropesa Castle, in the hands of Republicans, lay in the line of their advance.

In the small hours of 30 August 1936 the castle and Parador were taken over in a surprise attack by the Tenth Rifle Company of the Nationalist forces led by Lieutenant Alfonso Mora Requejo under Colonel Carlos Asensio Cabanillas. More than 200 government troops were killed in the taking of Oropesa, including young members of the Juventudes Socialistas Unificadas (Unified Socialist Youth) battalions who had been brought in to help defend the town, while one battalion and one company were taken prisoner. Many captured commanders were shot immediately. Extensive war materials were captured.

On taking the castle, the Nationalist Legionaries discovered that the Republicans, aided by their civilian supporters in Oropesa, had rounded up and assembled the opposing bourgeoisie of the town in the main courtyard with the intention of setting fighting bulls loose amongst them. Eyewitness reports also suggested that several of the town's priests had been seized, tortured and beaten in the castle's courtyard before one was murdered with Bullfighters' banderillas. The Nationalists quickly overwhelmed the castle's defenders, who put up little resistance, and the forcibly assembled townspeople were released.

Hours after its fall to the Nationalists the US journalist Hubert Renfro Knickerbocker entered the castle:

"Two banderas of the Legion were quartered here now. ... They had marched and fought all night long and now they ... slept in heaps .. in every corner of shade the castle court afforded ... In the middle of the courtyard under the blazing sun a very old crone dug around in a vast heap of wreckage ... I went on upstairs, leaping across machine guns, threading my way between stacked rifles, to the quarters of Lieutenant-Colonel Laureado Don Heli R. de Tella, chief of the column advancing on Madrid ... He stood at the window of his quarters on the second floor of the castle where the hotel part used to be and showed me how he took the town just a few hours before. 'We only lost one dead and eight wounded; the Reds lost I don't know how many.'"

Shortly after Knickerbocker's interview with de Tella in the Parador machine guns were heard firing from the castle's towers. A Republican armoured train which had appeared on the railway just below was shelling and machine-gunning the castle and Parador. The Nationalist Legionaries were responding. "I ran across the parapet, reached the stairway to the topmost tower and came out near a heavy 50-caliber machine-gun firing so fast men stood pouring buckets of water on the barrel," reported Knickerbocker for the International News Service. "Amazing rage struck the Legionaries as bullets from the armored train hit the parapet ... For an hour the mutual killing went on."

At much the same time in the air above the Parador on 31 August, two Nationalist Fiat CR.32 aircraft (flown by Italian Aviazione Legionaria pilots) were shot down in a dogfight with Hispano-Nieuport Nid52, Dewoitine D.372 and Hawker Fury aircraft flown by the Republic.

The fighting moved on and the Nationalists remained in control of the castle at Oropesa for the remainder of the war. Lieutenant Colonel Maximino Bartomeu took up residence in the Parador while the hotel areas of the Palace and other parts of the establishment were converted into a military barracks. Some of the Parador workers suffered reprisals for having previously provided hospitality to the Republican militia.

== Post-war reconstruction ==
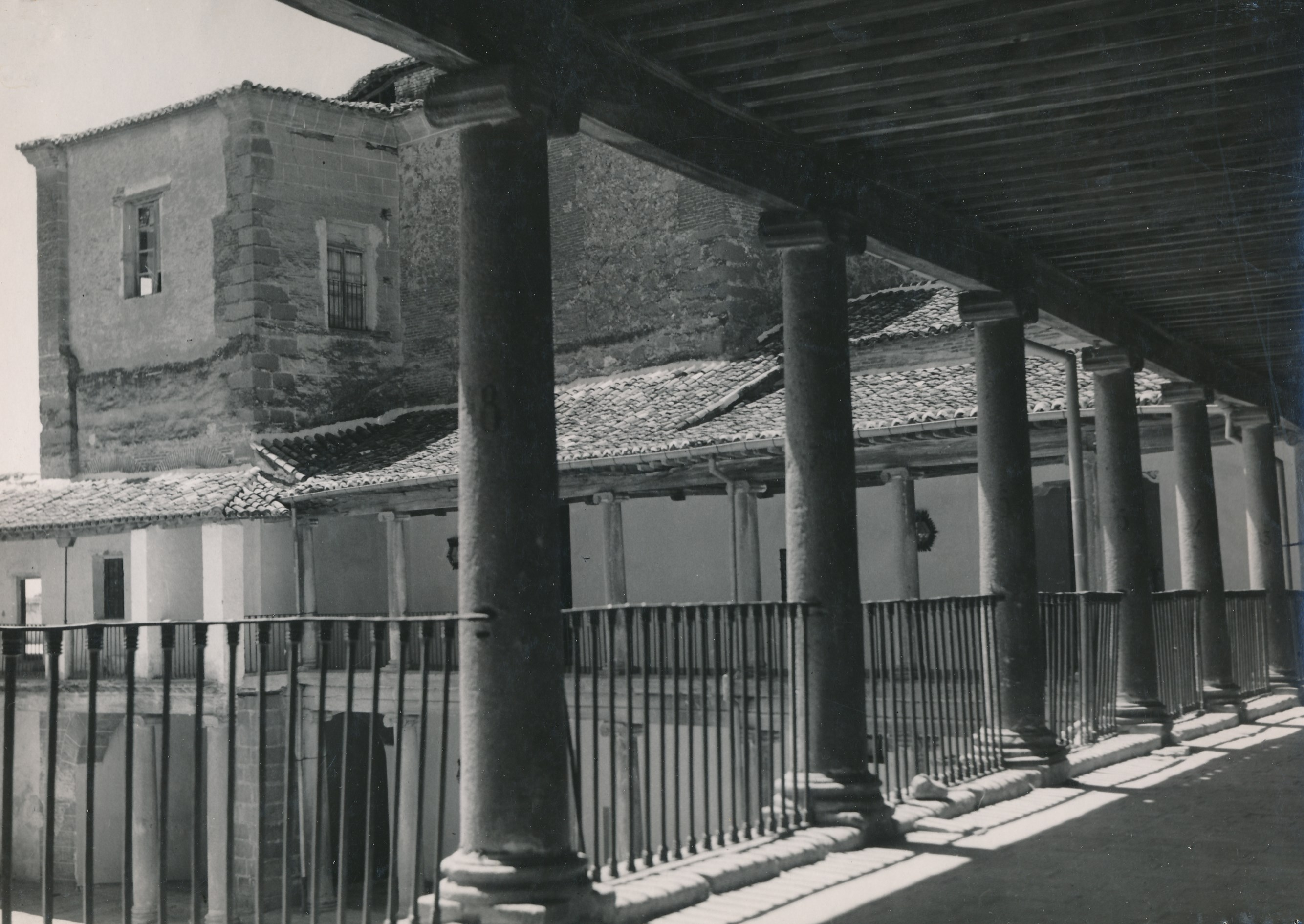
The gallery and rear of the New Palace in the early 1940s

When the Civil War ended in April 1939 with Francisco Franco established as dictator of Spain, the original Parador establishment within the New Palace was found to have been so comprehensively damaged by shelling and machine-gunning and by over two-and-a-half years of occupation as barracks that it had to be repaired and remodelled. The architect appointed to carry out this task was Luis Martínez Feduchi Ruiz, who had carried out the original conversion. He took the opportunity to expand the Parador into adjoining areas of the buildings, including former teachers' homes on the main floor and some of the ground floor premises. The general facilities were improved and there were now eight double rooms and one single, six of them en suite, and shared bathroom facilities for those rooms which lacked them. The public rooms comprised a dining room and two lounges with grand fireplaces. The Parador de Oropesa reopened to the public on 12 December 1942.

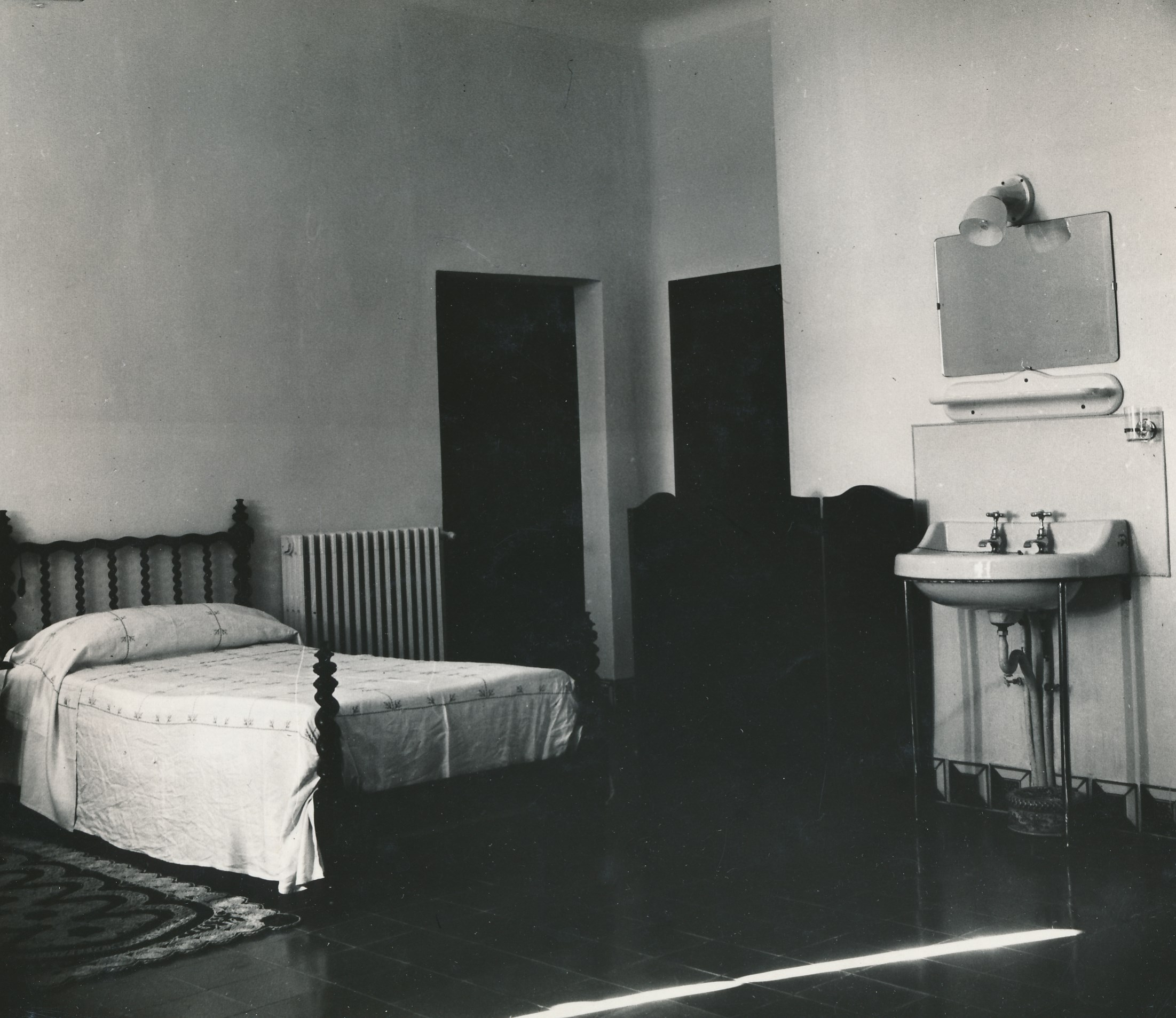
A 1943 bedroom

Prices had risen from before the hostilities. Bed and breakfast in a room with ensuite facilities now cost 64 pesetas. The dinner set menu was 30 pesetas.

In the 1940s the Parador de Oropesa became established as an important location for meetings between the intelligence services of Spain and Portugal (both countries then controlled by dictators) with leading officials organising their bilateral activities and endeavouring to control smuggling along the Spanish-Portuguese border, 140 kilometres to the west. Local civil governors also met at the Parador to organise the pursuit of the guerrilleros antfranquistas (anti-Francisco Franco guerrilla forces) still hiding in the mountain ranges of the region.

== The Parador de Oropesa into the modern age ==
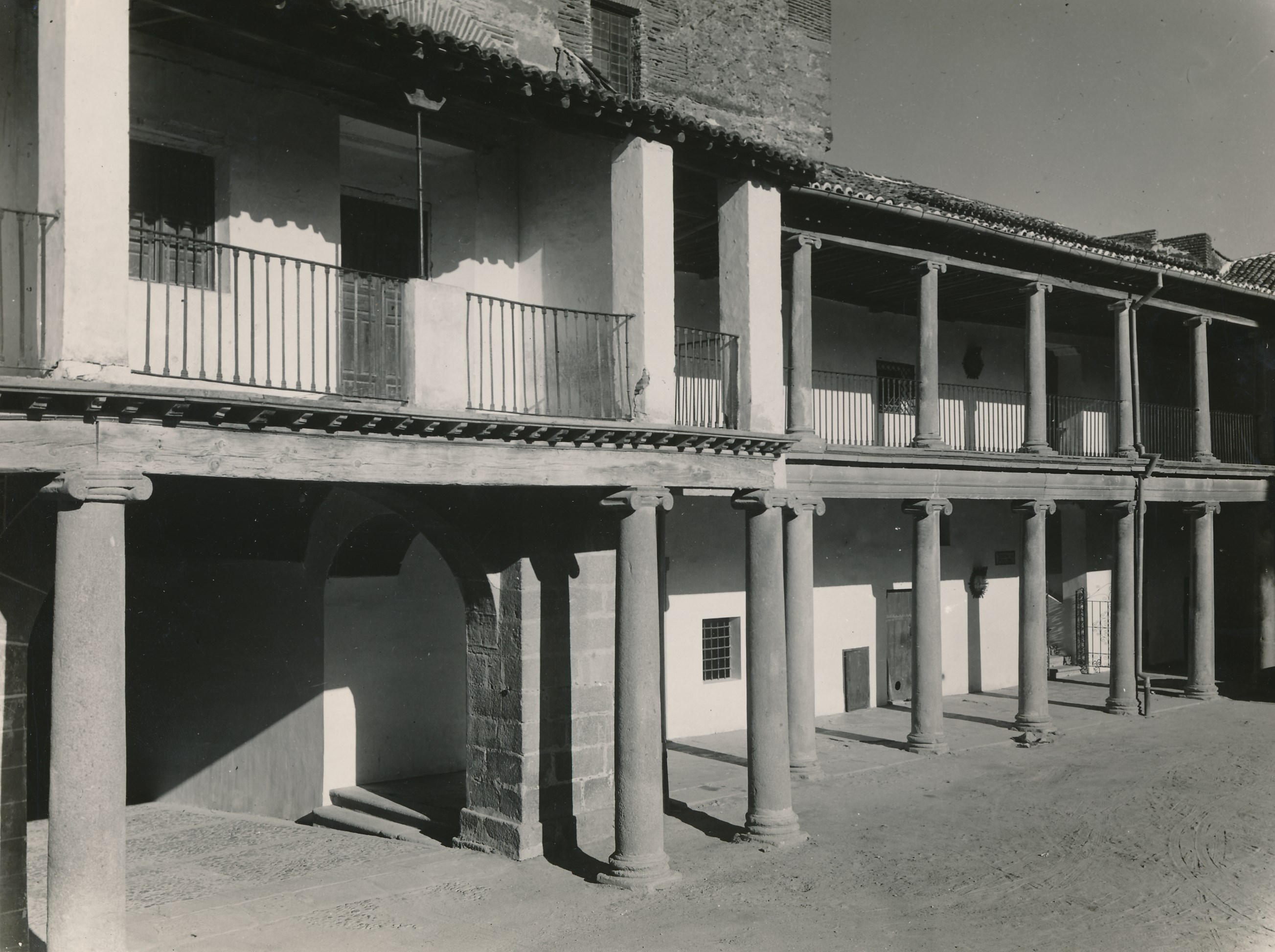
The gallery in 1951

By 1947 a rationalisation of the use of the castle and palaces at Oropesa was required due to the number of other organisations using them and coexisting in the space. So began a long series of occasional closures and reworking over the next 45 years together with the departure of organisations unconnected with the Parador operation. Two architects were involved consecutively: the first was Julián Luís Manzano Monís (1919–2012) and the second Carlos Fernández-Cuenca Gómez. Under their supervision the Parador had expanded by June 1992 with the capacity for 96 guests in 44 double rooms and 4 suites, with an outdoor swimming pool and a convention centre. The audience bleachers on two sides of the courtyard, built for its occasional use as a bullring, had been demolished. The dining room had been moved to the first floor of the Old Palace into the area previously used by the Civil Guard, its polychrome coffered ceiling dating from the 15th century having been restored. The bricking up of the loggia viewpoint had been removed and replaced by full-height glazing. An extension had been built on the existing terrace in the southwest rear part of the New Palace, providing another three bedrooms on each floor. The Old and New Palaces had been properly connected internally.

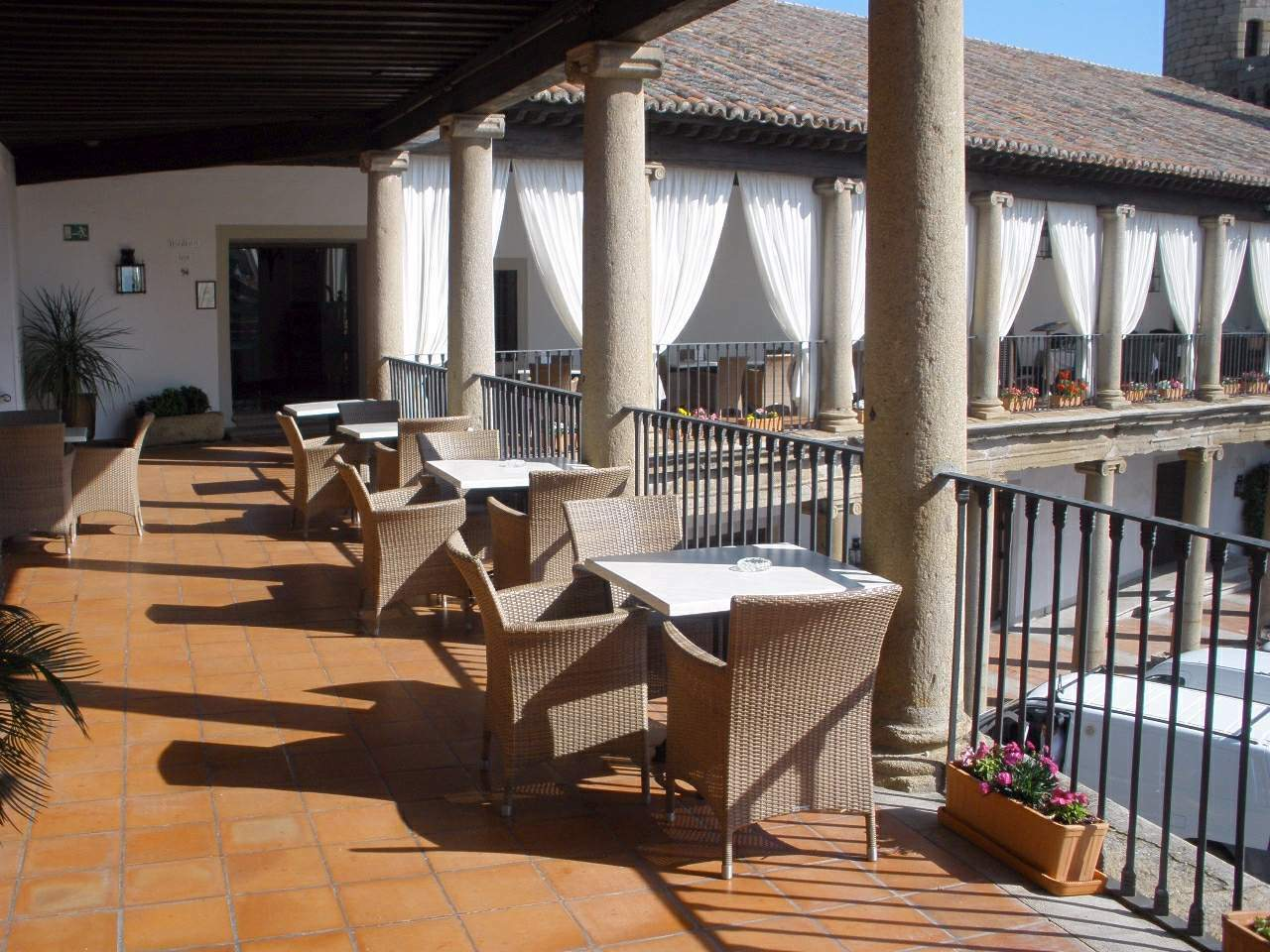
The gallery in 2017

Further restoration work was carried out in several phases between 2001 and 2016 by local architect Mauro Cano. The commission was to bring the Parador up to date in terms of its uses and to the regulations regarding accessibility, safety and hygiene. Large banqueting rooms were built on the ground floor that are capable of subdivision when required. The dining room was opened to the outside through the glazed gallery to the north and onto the galleried terraces looking to the south. In the courtyard next to the castle wall a wooden cage was constructed to hide the Parador's external machinery and fans. In the course of the work an old cistern was discovered and brought back to its original function of supplying water.

On 2 March 1993 the Palacio Nuevo was declared a Monumento Nacional (National Monument).

In 1966 the Parador was given the name Virrey de Toledo in honour of Francisco Álvarez de Toledo (1512–1582), a brother of the third count of Oropesa, who was the fifth Viceroy of Peru in 1568, holding office for 12 years.

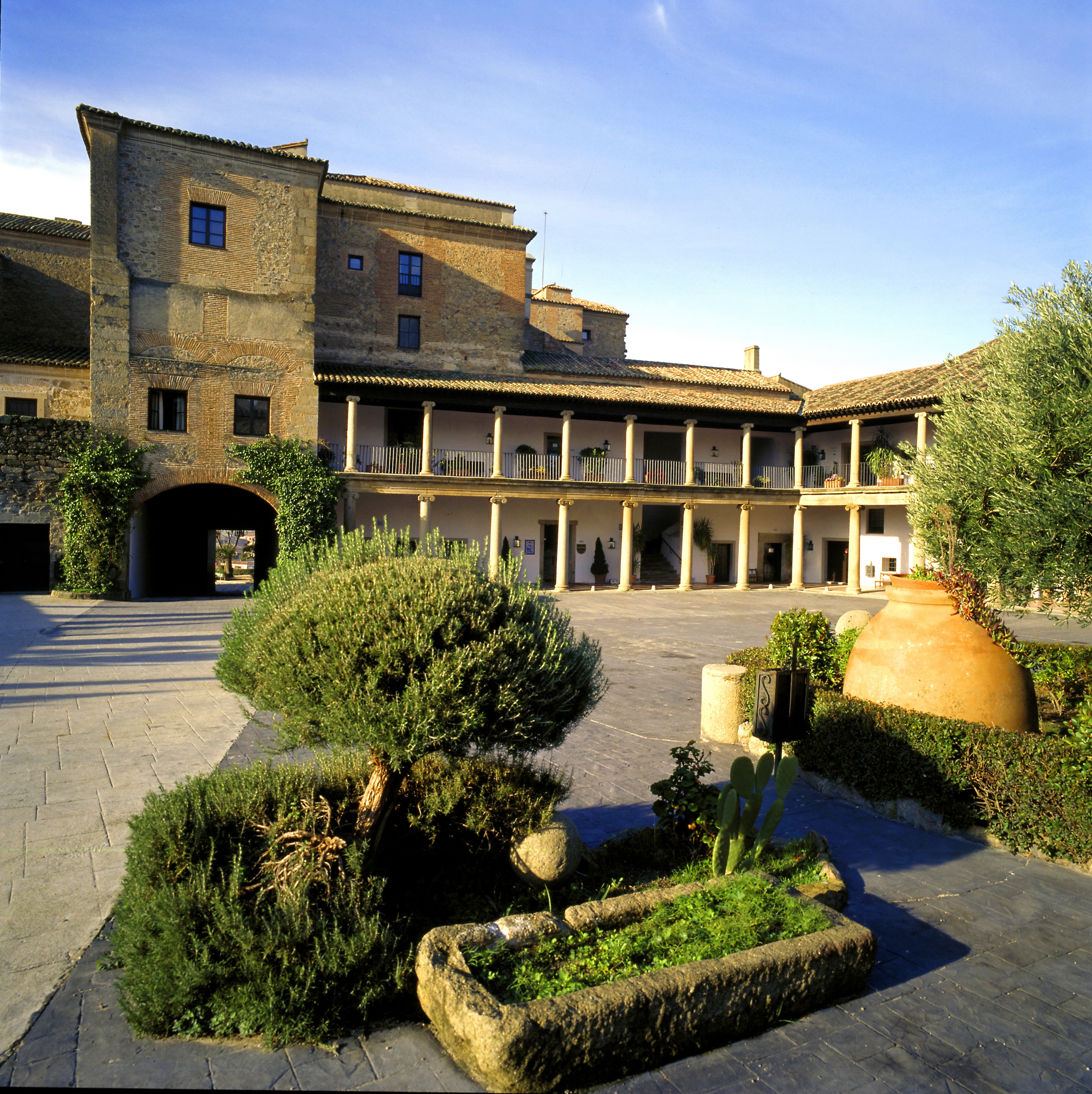
The rear of the New Palace, the gallery and the courtyard in 2014

In July 2010, celebrating the 80th anniversary of its inauguration, the Oropesa Parador became what the Paradores organisation call a "parador-museo". 31 information points were placed around the building, with explanatory texts in Spanish and English explaining the history of the building with old photographs, plans and further illustrations of the past of the palace, including its origins, the architectural character of the different spaces and the uses they had in the past, the people linked to the building, and the history of Oropesa.

The Parador de Oropesa is now one of the most important historic buildings managed by the Parador chain and is one of the most popular, with 20,000 guests staying each year and 40,000 meals a year being served by the restaurant.

== Parador de Oropesa in film ==
The Parador de Oropesa makes an appearance in the 1957 film The Pride and the Passion, directed by Stanley Kramer in which the American singer and actor Frank Sinatra, playing an anti-Napoleon guerrilla fighter, appeals to spectators in the courtyard, temporarily converted back into its bullring setting, for help in pulling a giant cannon from a river. Scenes from other films have been shot at the Parador de Oropesa, including the Spanish language movies La Malquerida in 1940 (soon after the Civil War) which included a bullfighting scene set in the courtyard, and in 1954 El Tren Expreso featuring a Spanish star of the 1950s, Jorge Mistral.
