= Architecture of Algeria =

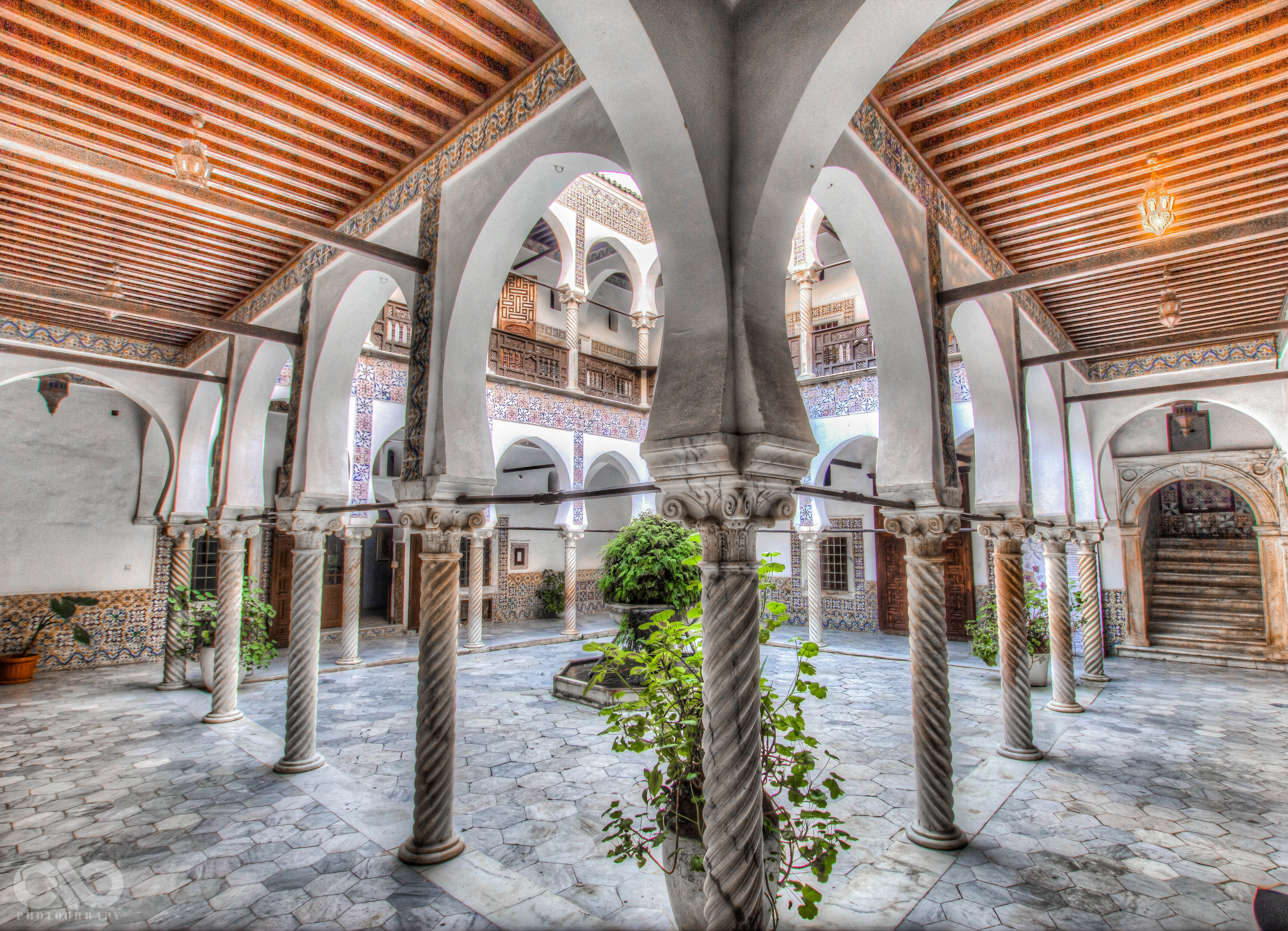
The Dar Khadaoudj El Amia in Algiers, a former 16th-century Ottoman era palace, now Museum of Popular Arts and Traditions

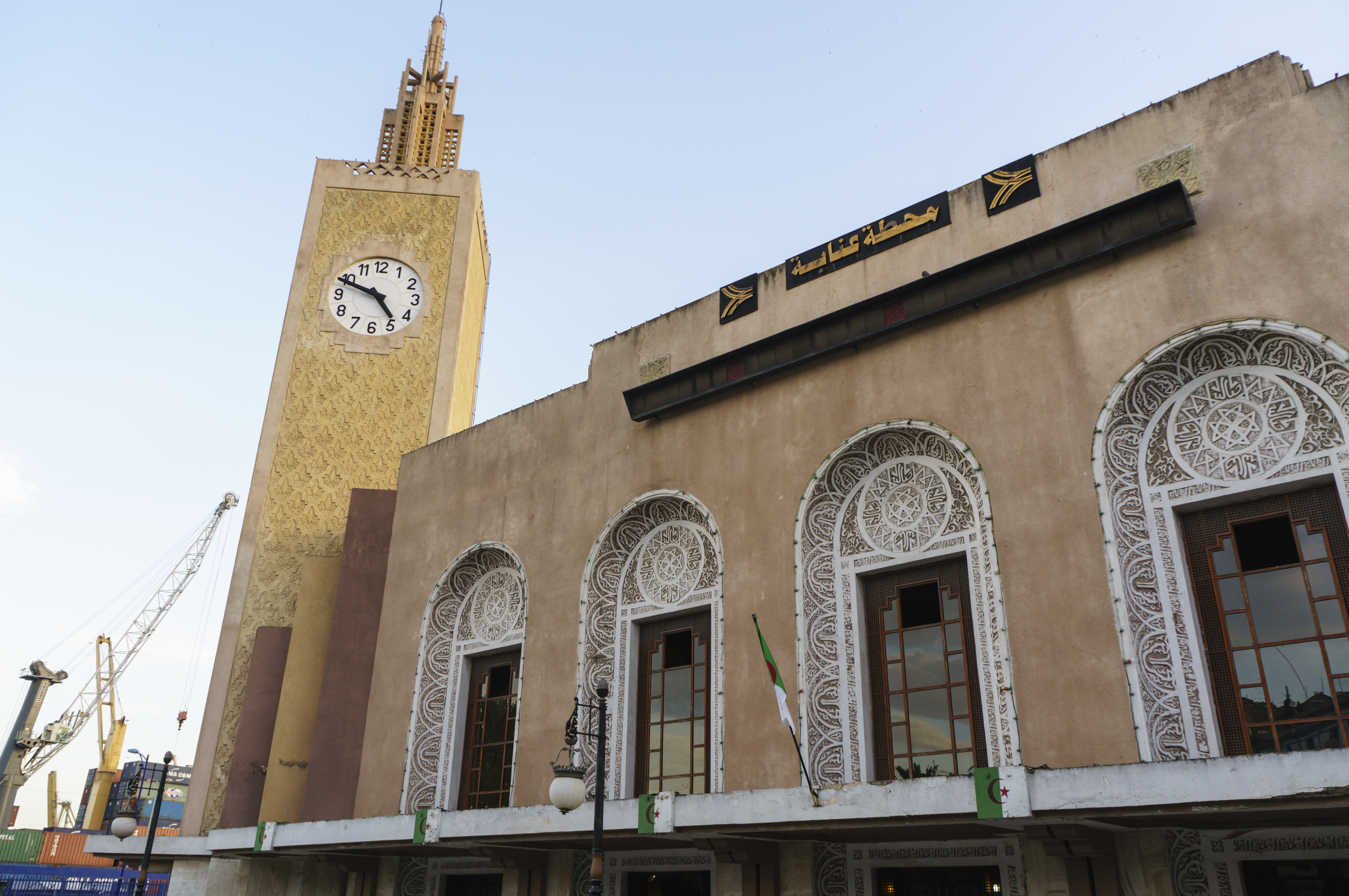
Annaba train station, built in 1933 during French colonial era with a Moorish Revival architecture

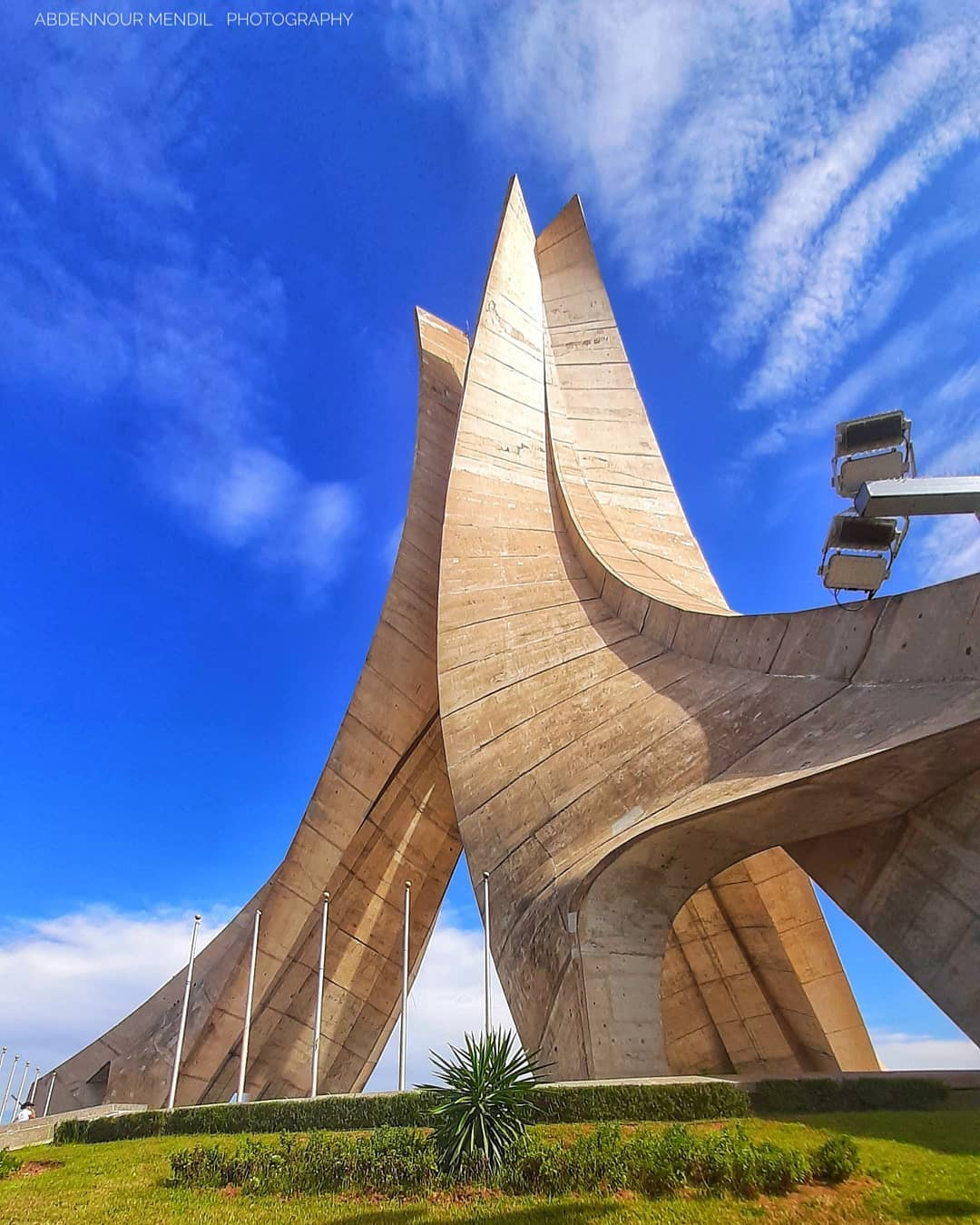
The Maqam Echahid (1981-1982), inaugurated 20 years after independence

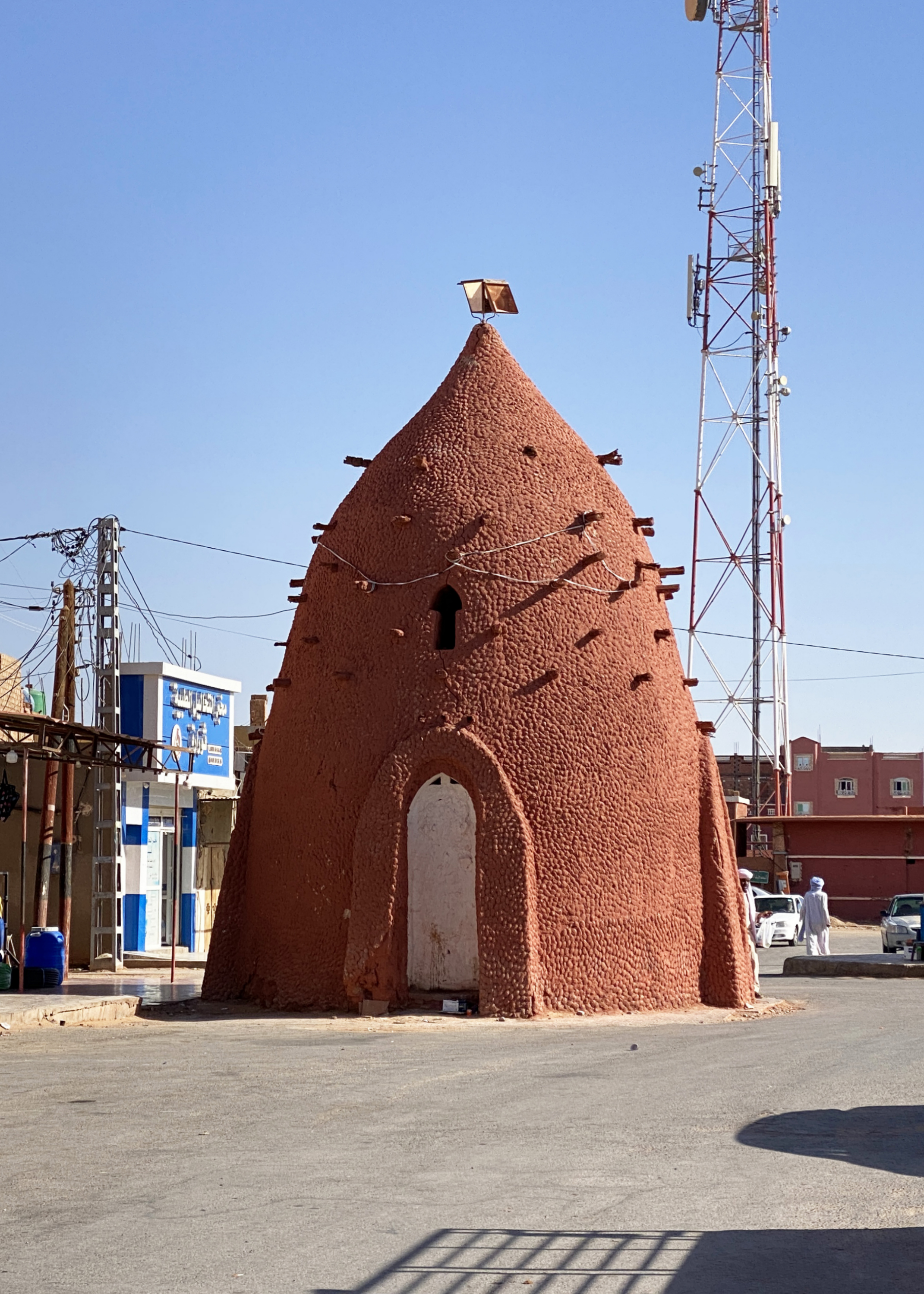
A traditional foggāra in Timimoun

The architecture of Algeria encompasses a diverse history influenced by a number of internal and external forces, including the Roman Empire, Muslim conquest of the Maghreb, French colonization, and movements for Algerian independence.

== Ancient Carthage ==
Ancient Carthage gained control of coastal Algeria by the 5th century BC. The empire's influence on Algerian architecture is visible in the adoption of hybridized styles that integrated Punic, Hellenistic, and Roman architecture into pre existing architectural traditions.

== Royal Numidian architecture ==
Under the ancient Berber kingdoms of Numidia and Mauretania, Algeria saw increased urban development. "Numidian Royal Architecture" is the term coined for the monuments constructed by the Numidian kings, which comprise tombs, tumuli and sanctuaries. Urbanization is especially associated with the reigns of kings Masinissa (202 BC–148 BC) and Juba II (30 BC – 25 AD). Evidence of urban planning during the kingdom of Mauretania has been found in neighboring Morocco and Tunisia. Juba II and his wife, Cleopatra Selene, were clients of Rome and promoters of late Hellenistic culture. They used Iol (modern Cherchell) as their royal capital, renaming it Caesarea and developing it into a city with a regular grid plan and the kind of architecture associated with the Roman Augustan period. Some structures in Caesarea have been dated or tentatively dated to Juba's time, including the theater, the amphitheater, and the harbor.

A number of large scale funerary monuments and tombs built during the era are the most well documented examples of Berber kingdom architecture. The monuments combine a number of different architectural styles introduced by the Carthaginians, frequently referencing Hellenistic and Punic motifs. The oldest of these is Medracen in present-day Algeria. Possibly influenced by Greek architecture further east, or built with the help of Greek craftsmen, the tomb consists of a large tumulus constructed in well-cut ashlar masonry and featuring sixty Doric columns and an Egyptian-style cornice. The mausoleum has been dated to fourth century BC or to the time of Masinissa at the end of the third century BC and the first half of the second century BC. Another famous example is the Royal Mausoleum of Mauretania in western Algeria, which may date from the time of Juba II. This structure consists of a stone tumulus, decorative columns, and spiral pathways that lead to a single interior chamber. A number of "tower tombs" from the Numidian period can also be found in sites from Algeria to Libya. Despite their wide geographic range, they often share a similar style: usually a three-story structure topped by a convex pyramid. They may have initially been inspired by Greek monuments but they constitute an original type of structure associated with Numidian culture. Examples of these have been found at Siga and Soumaa d'el Khroub, as well as at Dougga (in present-day Tunisia) and Sabratha (in Libya).

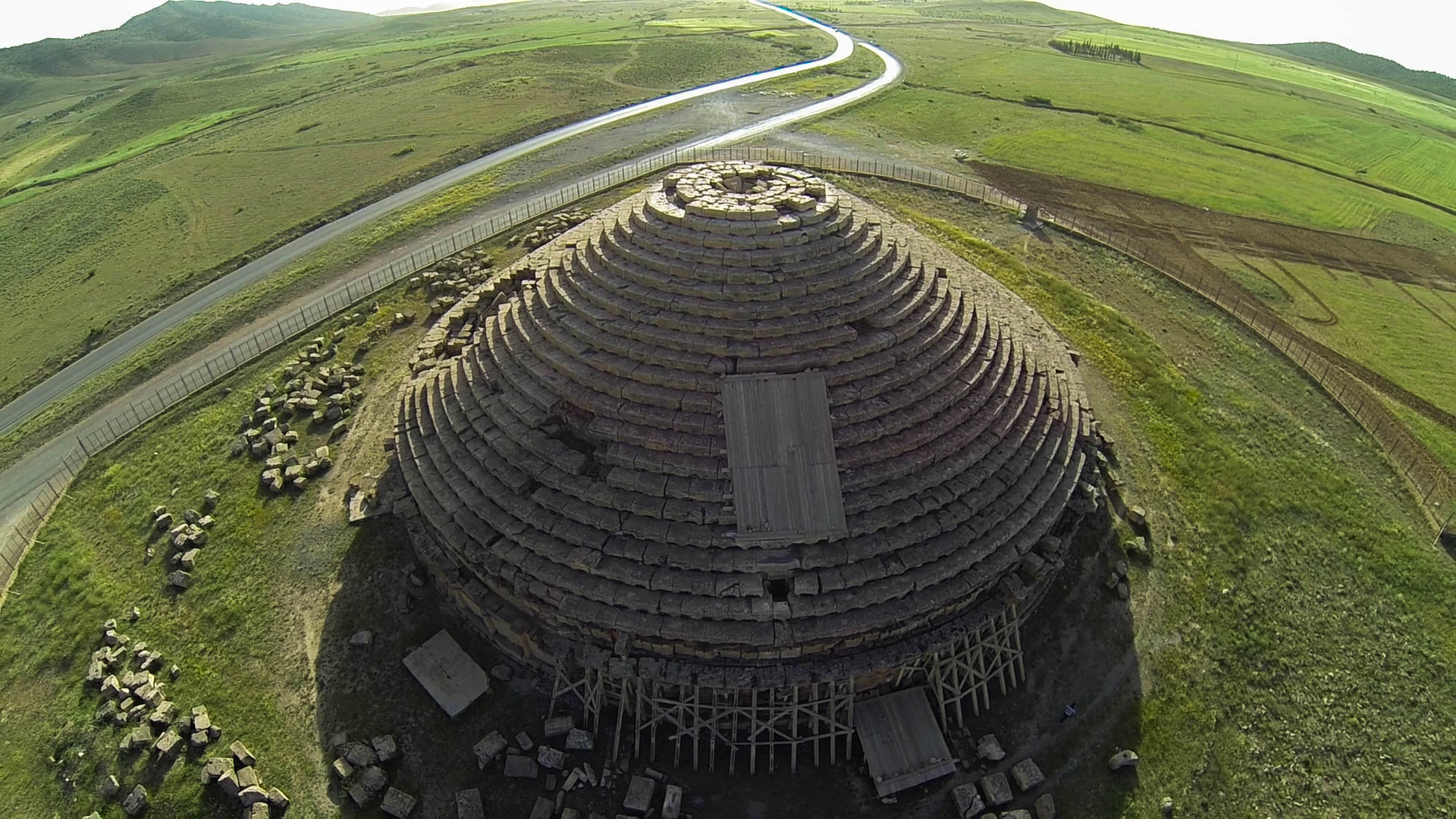
The Medracen mausoleum in Batna Province, built sometime between the 4th century BC and second century BC

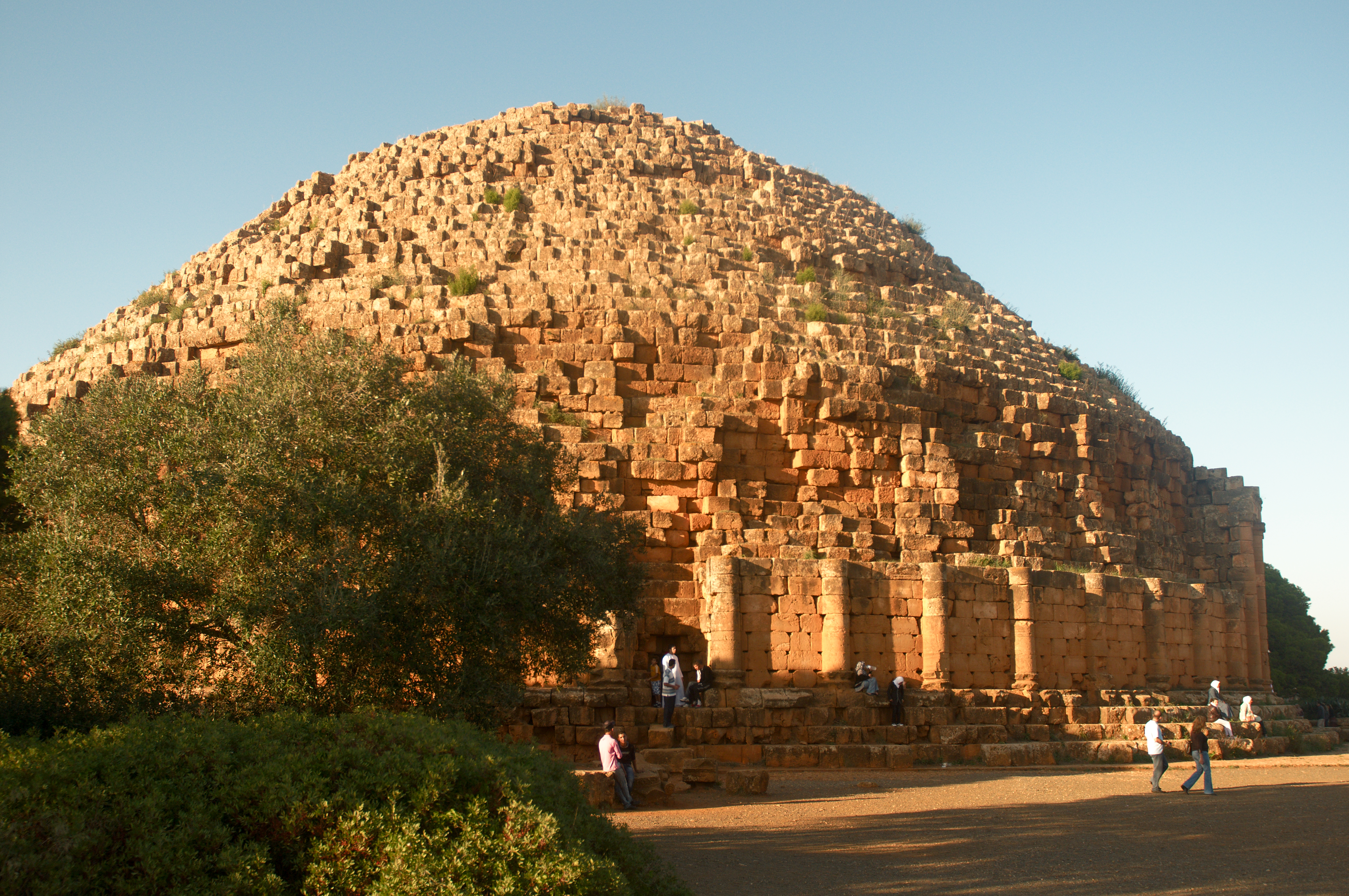
Royal Mausoleum of Mauretania, built in the late 1st century BC or early 1st century AD

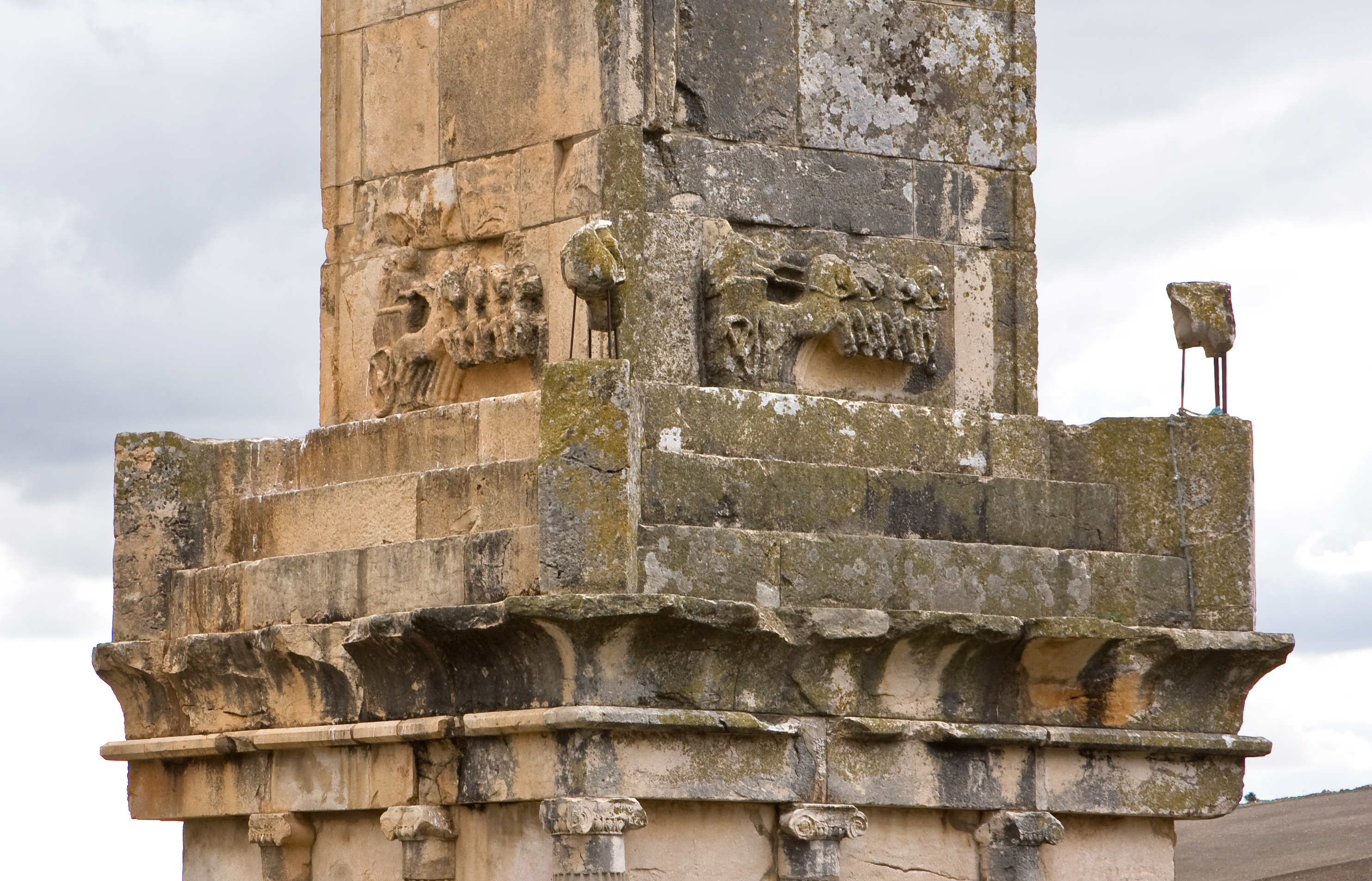
Hellenistic and Punic motifs visible on the 2nd century BC Mausoleum of Dougga (in present-day Tunisia)

== Roman era ==
The Romans annexed eastern Numidia in 46 BC. After the death of Arabio, six years later, Western Numidia was annexed as well. The two provinces were later combined with Tripolitania to form the Roman province of Africa Proconsularis.

The Romans built more than 500 towns and cities in what is now Algeria. When developing plans for their new cities, Roman engineers most frequently utilized an orthogonal, rectilinear grid plan characterized by a decumanus (east-west oriented street) and cardo (north-south oriented street). The two streets were capped with gates as each of their terminals and a forum stood at their intersection.

The city of Timgad, established by Trajan around 100 AD, is a well preserved example of Roman urban planning in Algeria. The city is laid out in an exact square, measuring 1,200 Roman feet on all four sides. The city was further subdivided into square city blocks, each with an area of 100 square Roman feet.

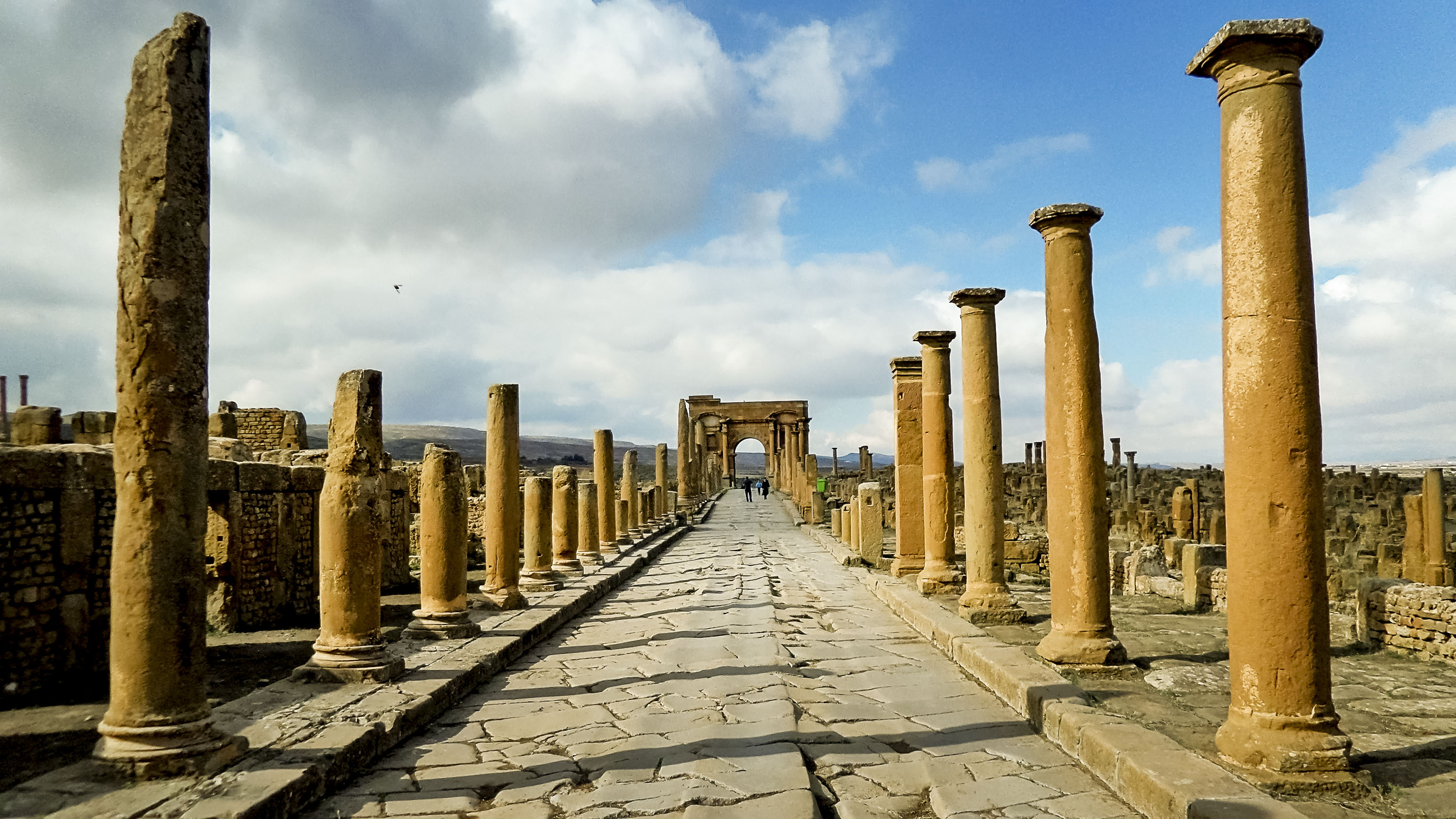
The decumanus in the Roman city of Timgad

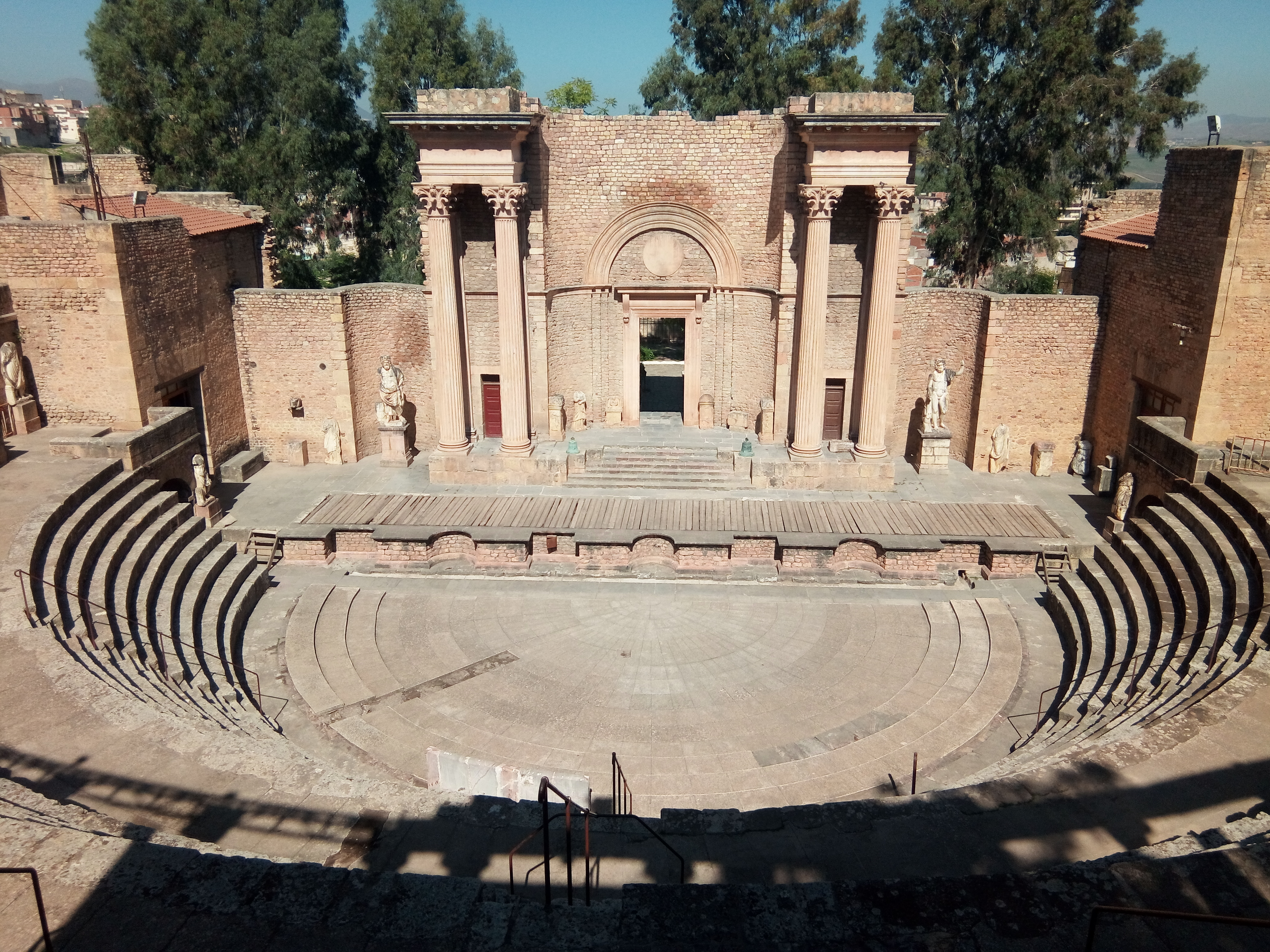
Roman theatre in Guelma (ancient Calama)

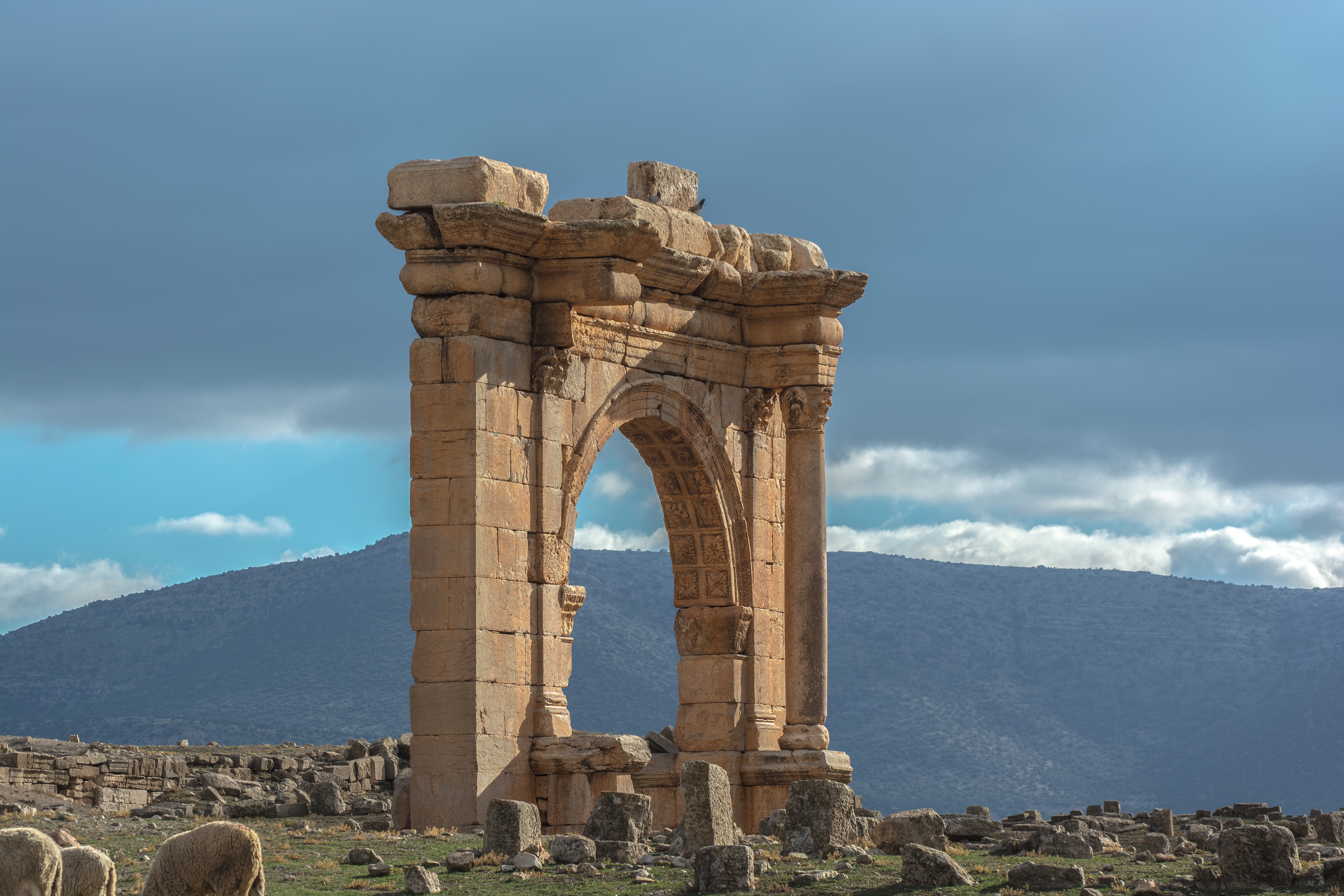
Triumphal arch of Marcus Aurelius and Lucius Verus, built in 165 AD, in Diana Veteranorum

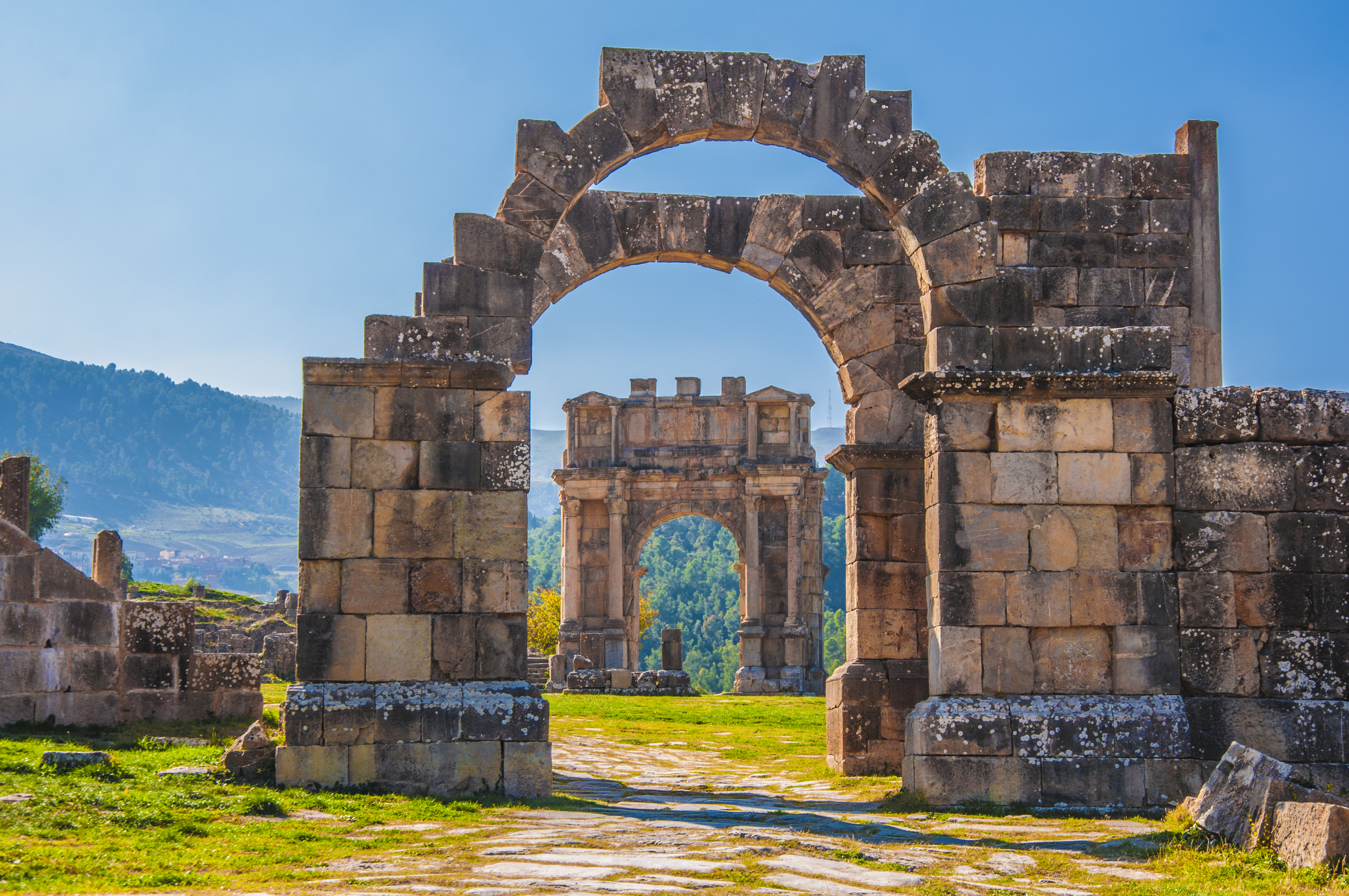
Ruins of Roman city of Cuicul, listed as a UNESCO World Heritage Site in 1982

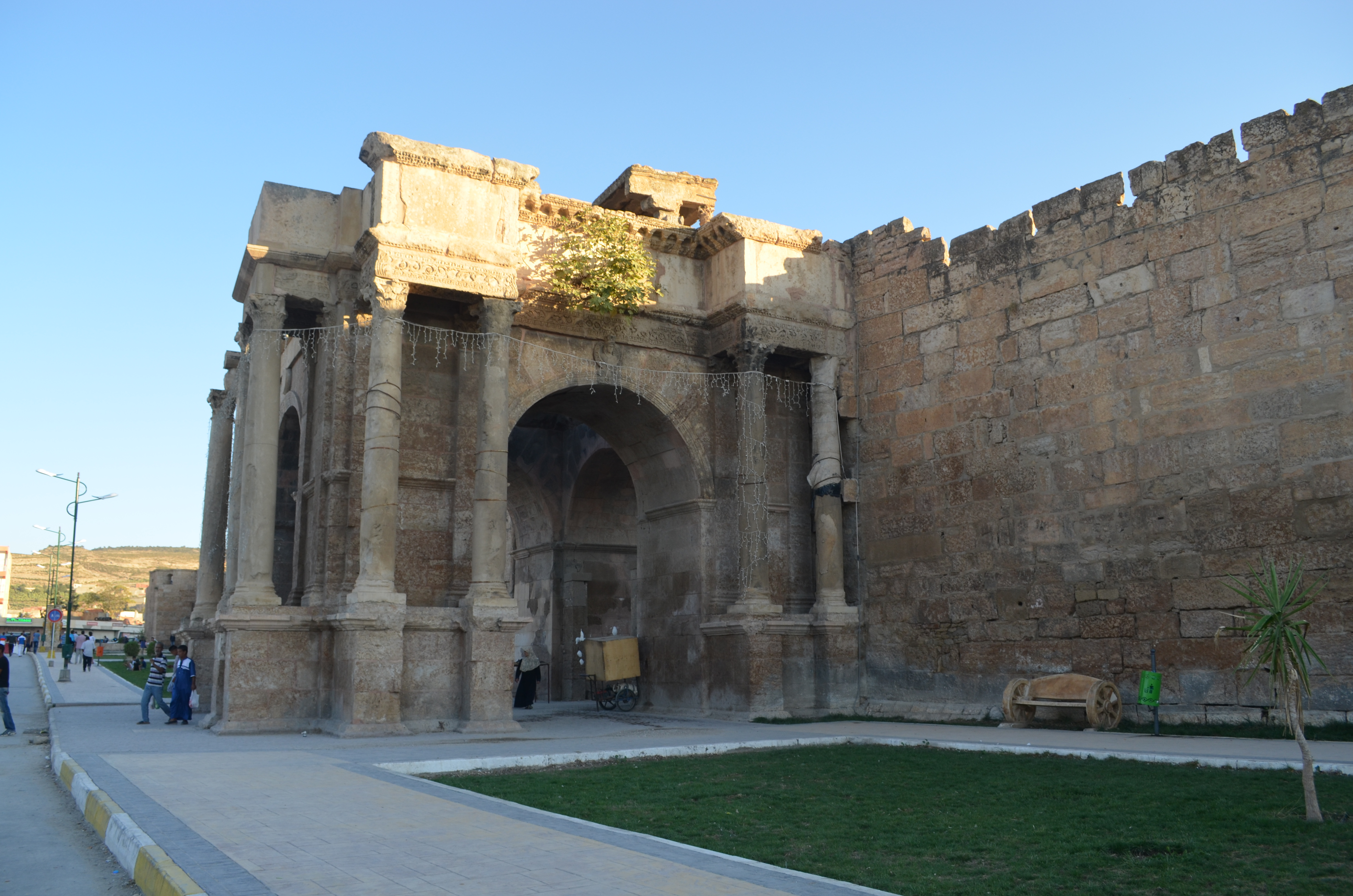
Arch of Caracalla in Tébessa (ancient Theveste)

== Early Islamic era ==
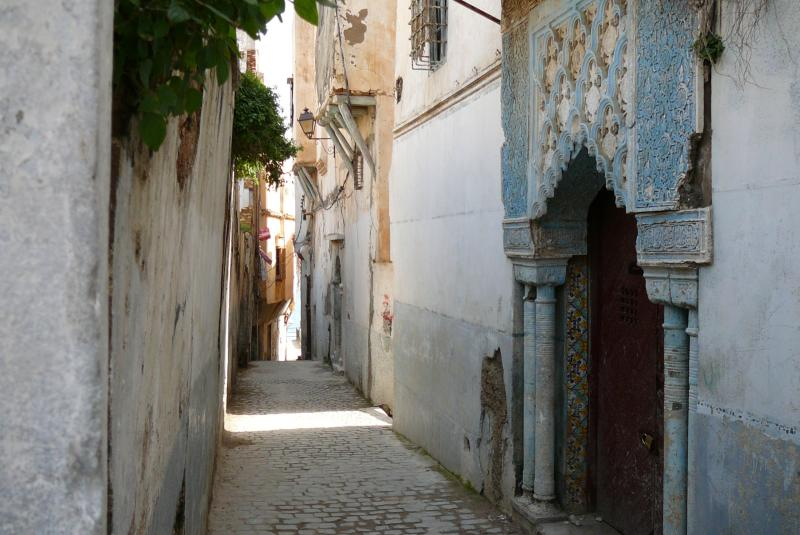
Street in the Casbah of Algiers

Islam reached Algeria in the 7th century via the Muslim conquest of Northern Africa. Islamic conquest brought many of the hallmark features of Muslim cities to Algeria, including the souq as a commercial center, the hammam as a social center, and the mosque and accompanying madrasa as a religious center. The city of Algiers, whose old district is known as the Casbah, developed during this era.

With the introduction of Islam to Algeria, the Algerian city experienced a reconstruction. In accordance with the Quran, cities were separated into public space (halal) and a private space reserved for women and families (harīm). Residential areas of cities additionally became increasingly segregated into religious quarters. As opposed to the exclusionary European ghetto, these quarters provided insular cultural centers for Jewish and Islamic life within the Algerian city.

After the initial Muslim conquest, the region was controlled by multiple successive dynasties including the Rustamids, the Aghlabids, the Fatimids, and the Zirids. The Mosque of Sidi Uqba, in the village of Sidi Okba (near Biskra), is reputedly the oldest Islamic monument in Algeria, as it contains the tomb of Uqba ibn Nafi, dated to 686. The mosque itself, a simple hypostyle structure similar to early mosques in Medina, was probably modified and renovated in later periods, including by the Zirids in the 11th century. In 790, Idris I, the founder of the Idrisid dynasty, founded the Mosque of Agadir on the site of Roman settlement of Pomeria (later to become Tlemcen), whose remains have been excavated by modern archaeologists. The Rustamids established a new capital for themselves at Tahart (near present-day Tiaret), which was occupied seasonally by its semi-nomadic inhabitants. It was destroyed by the Fatimids in 909 but its remains were excavated in the 20th century. The city was surrounded by a fortified wall interspersed with square towers. It contained a hypostyle mosque, a fortified citadel on higher ground, and a palace structure with a large courtyard similar to the design of traditional houses.

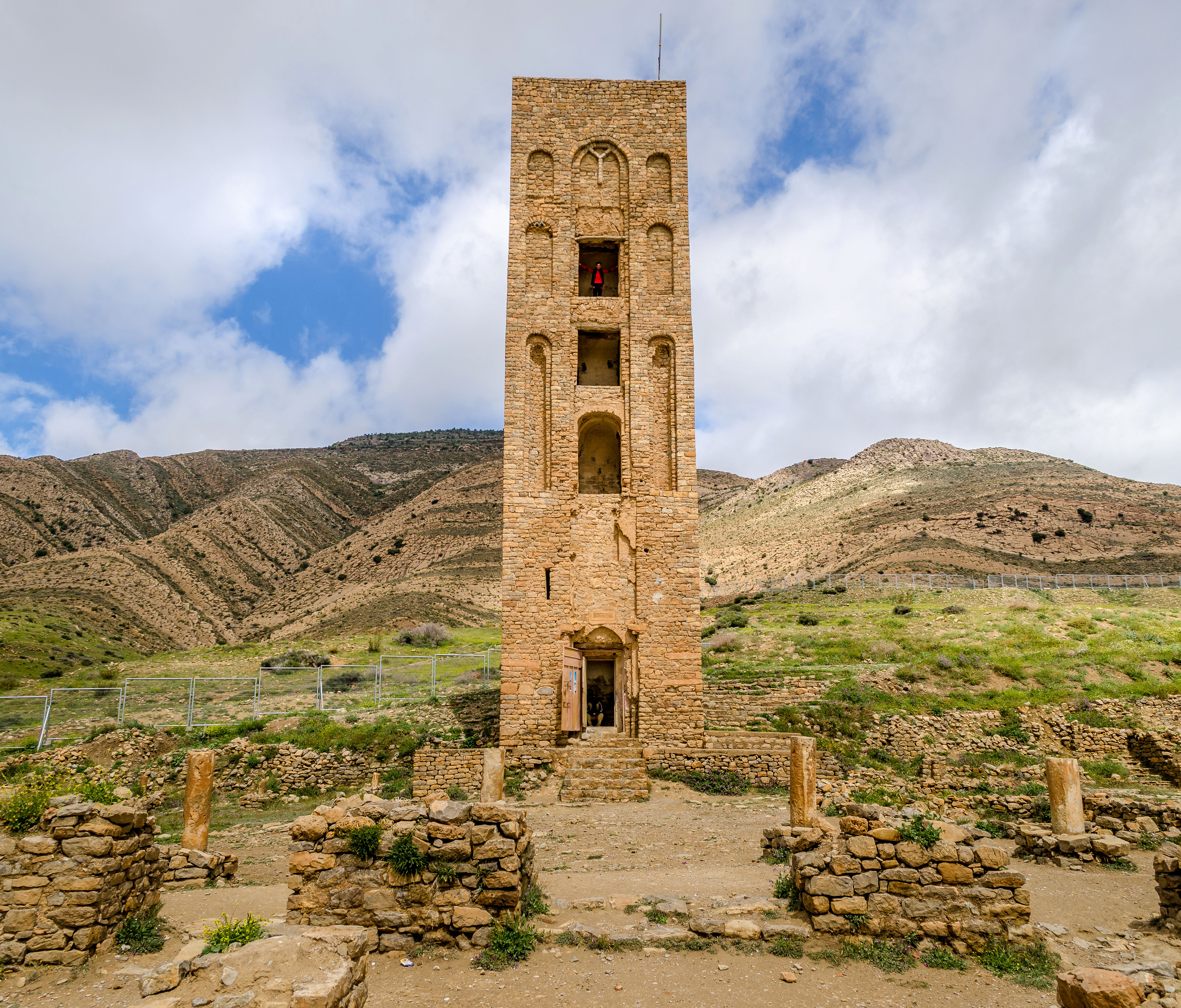
Minaret and remains of the mosque at Qal'at Bani Hammad (11th century)

In 934, while in the service of the Fatimid caliph al-Qa'im, the Zirid leader Ziri ibn Manad built a palace at 'Ashir (near the present town of Kef Lakhdar in Algeria). It is one of the oldest palaces in the Maghreb to have been discovered and excavated by archeologists today. It was built in stone and has a carefully-designed symmetrical plan which included a large central courtyard and two smaller courtyards in each of the side wings of the palace. Some scholars believe this design imitated the now-lost Fatimid palaces of Mahdia. The Hammadids, an offshoot of the Zirids, based themselves in Algeria and in 1007 they founded an entirely new fortified capital known as Qala'at Bani Hammad, northeast of present-day M'Sila. Although abandoned and destroyed in the 12th century, the city has been excavated by modern archeologists and the site is one of the best-preserved medieval Islamic capitals in the world, with multiple palaces and a monumental mosque.

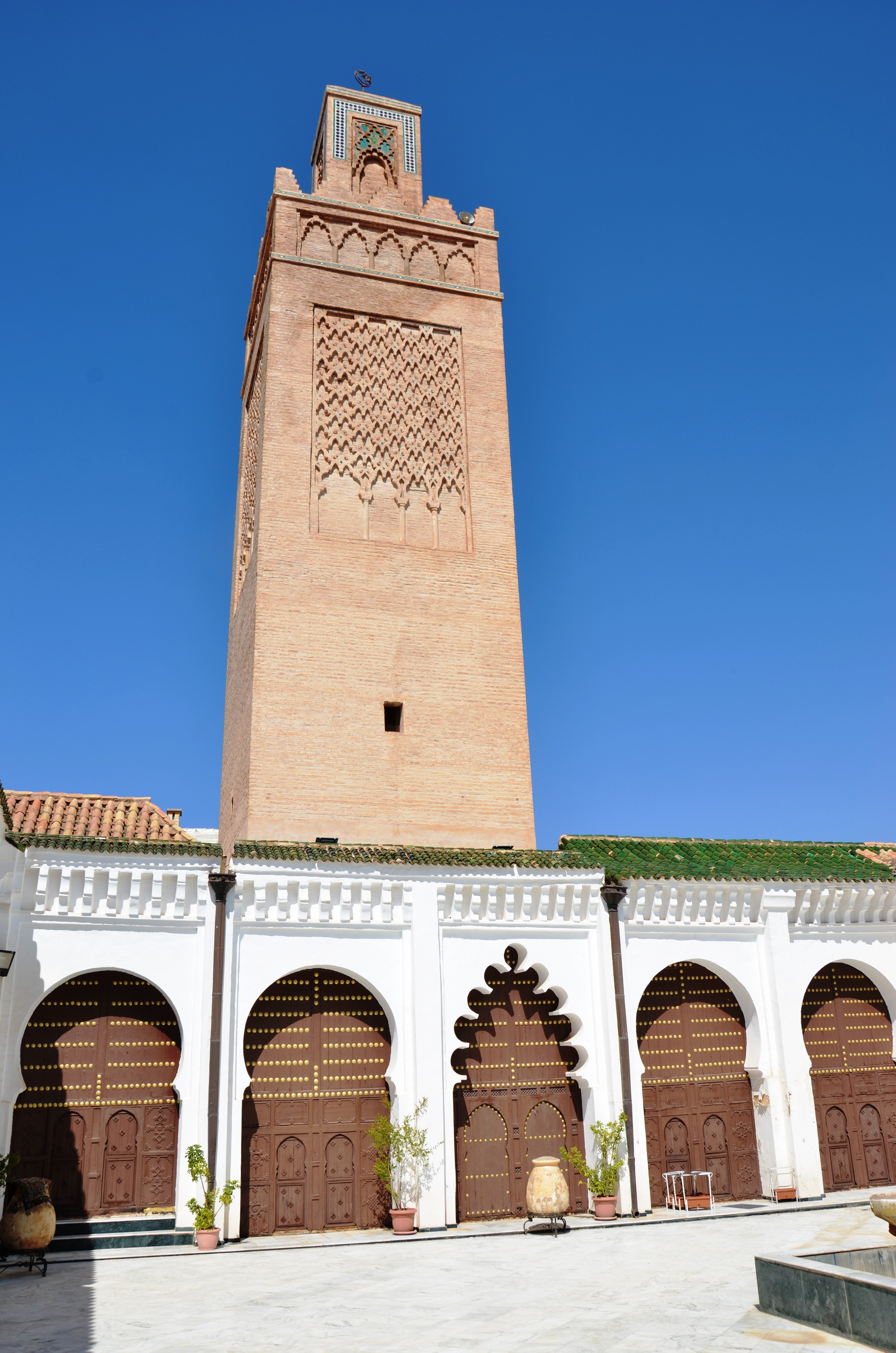
Great Mosque of Tlemcen, founded by the Almoravids in 1082 and expanded by the Zayyanids in 1236

From the late 11th to early 13th centuries varying extents of Algerian territory were controlled by the Almoravids and Almohads, Berber empires that ruled in North Africa and Al-Andalus (Muslim-controlled Iberian Peninsula). The Great Mosque of Tlemcen (1082), the Great Mosque of Algiers (1096–1097), and the Great Mosque of Nedroma (1145) are all important foundations from the Almoravid period. The Almoravid period, along with the subsequent Almohad period, is considered one of the most formative stages of "Moorish" (western Islamic) architecture, establishing many of the forms and motifs that defined architectural styles in the region during the subsequent centuries.

== Zayyanid period ==
After the Almohads, the Zayyanid or Abd al-Wadid dynasty ruled from their main capital at Tlemcen. Yaghmorasan (r. 1236–1283), the founder of the dynasty, added minarets to the earlier Mosque of Agadir and the Great Mosque of Tlemcen. His successor, Abu Sa'id 'Uthman (r. 1283–1304), founded the Mosque of Sidi Bel Hasan in 1296, also in Tlemcen. The Zayyanids built other religious foundations in and around the city, but many have not survived to the present day or have preserved little of their original appearance. Madrasas, such as the Madrasa Tashfiniya (founded by Abu Tashfin I, r. 1318–1337), were new institutions which were introduced to the Maghreb in the 13th century and proliferated under the Zayyanids and their contemporaries. The Marinid dynasty, based in Fez, intermittently occupied Tlemcen and also left their mark on the area. During his siege of the city at the beginning of the 14th century, the Marinid ruler Abu Ya'qub built a nearby fortified settlement named al-Mansurah, which includes the monumental Mansurah Mosque (begun in 1303, only partly preserved today). Further east, Abu al-Hasan founded the Mosque of Sidi Bu Madyan in 1338–39.

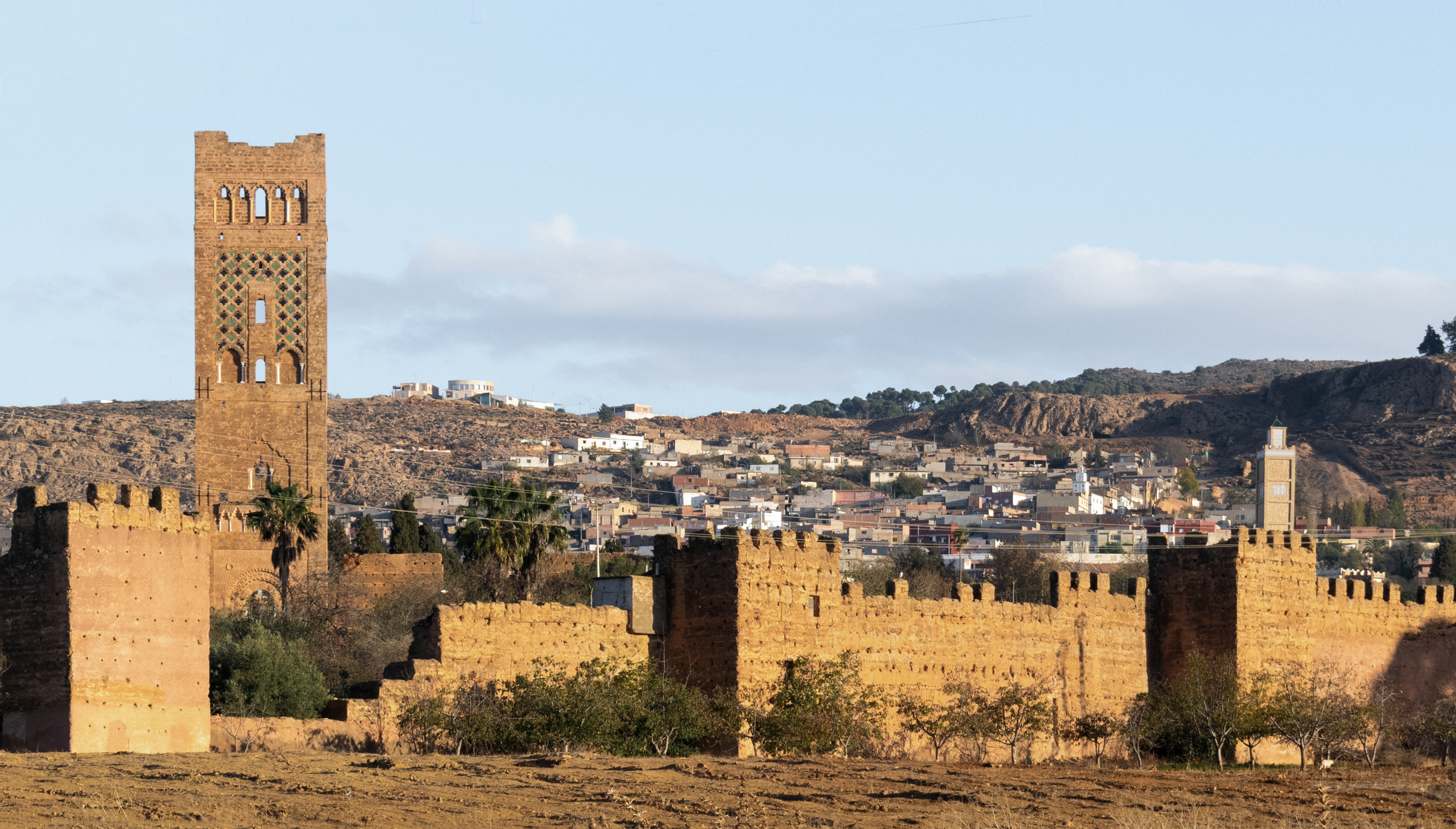
Rampart of Mansourah and minaret of the Mosque

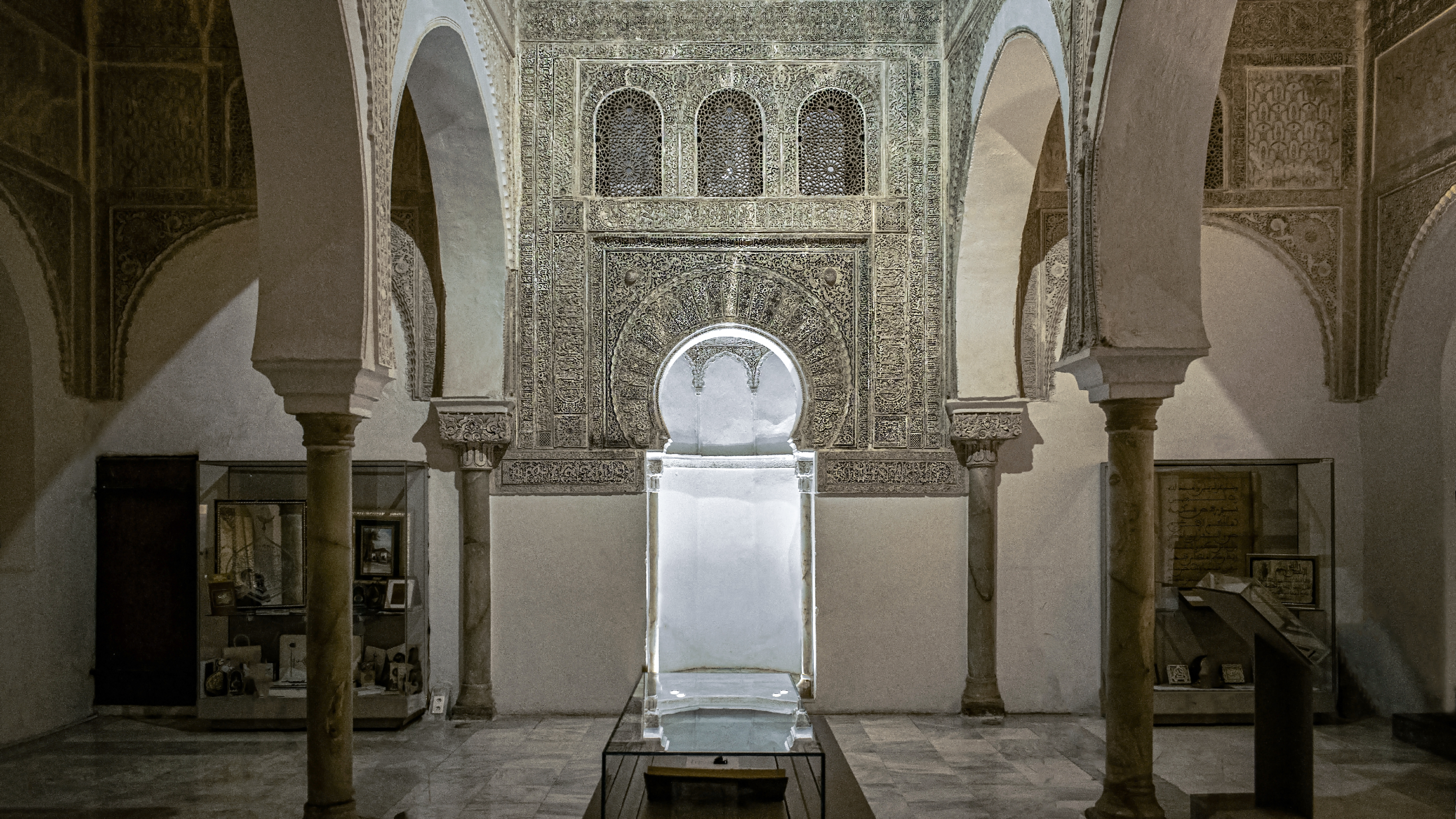
Prayer hall and mihrab of the Sidi Belahcen Mosque

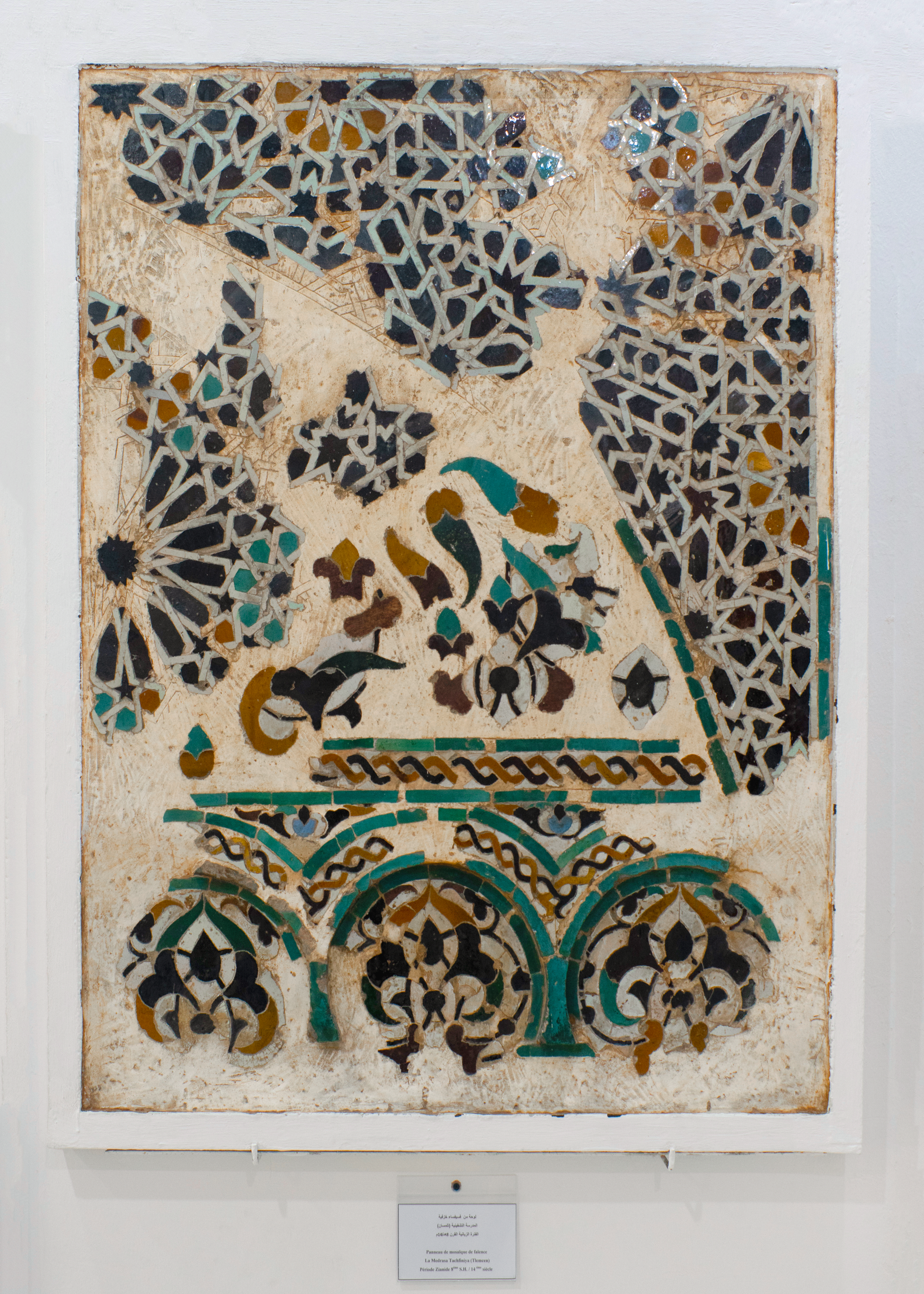
Fragments of zellij (mosaic tilework) decoration from the Madrasa Tashfiniya (retrieved prior to its 19th-century demolition)

== Ottoman period ==
In 1518 the Ottoman Empire gained control of Algeria. Under Ottoman rule, a hybrid style developed influenced by traditional Turkish styles, including central-plan mosques and glazed tile panels. The influence of Ottoman architecture was largely limited to the Algerian coast and, in particular, the regional capital of Algiers. Algiers developed into a major town and witnessed regular architectural patronage, and as such most of the major monuments from this period are found there. By contrast, the city of Tlemcen, formerly a major capital, went into relative decline and saw far less architectural activity.

Algiers was protected by a wall about 3.1 kilometres long, reinforced with bastions, and pierced by five gates. A citadel-fortress, the qasba (the origin of the current name "Casbah"), occupied the highest point of the town. By the end of the 18th century the city had over 120 mosques, including over a dozen congregational mosques. Most of the city's inhabitants were provided with water through a system of five major aqueducts and thousands of cisterns, with most houses having their own private cistern. The lower part of the city, near the shore, was the center of the Ottoman and Regency administration, containing the most important markets, mosques, wealthy residences, janissary barracks, government buildings (like the mint), and palaces.

=== Religious architecture ===
Mosque architecture in Algiers during this period demonstrates the convergence of multiple influences as well as peculiarities that may be attributed to the innovations of local architects. Domes of Ottoman influence were introduced into the design of mosques, but minarets generally continued to be built with square shafts instead of round or octagonal ones, thus retaining local tradition, unlike contemporary architecture in Ottoman Tunisia and other Ottoman provinces, where the "pencil"-shaped minaret was a symbol of Ottoman sovereignty.

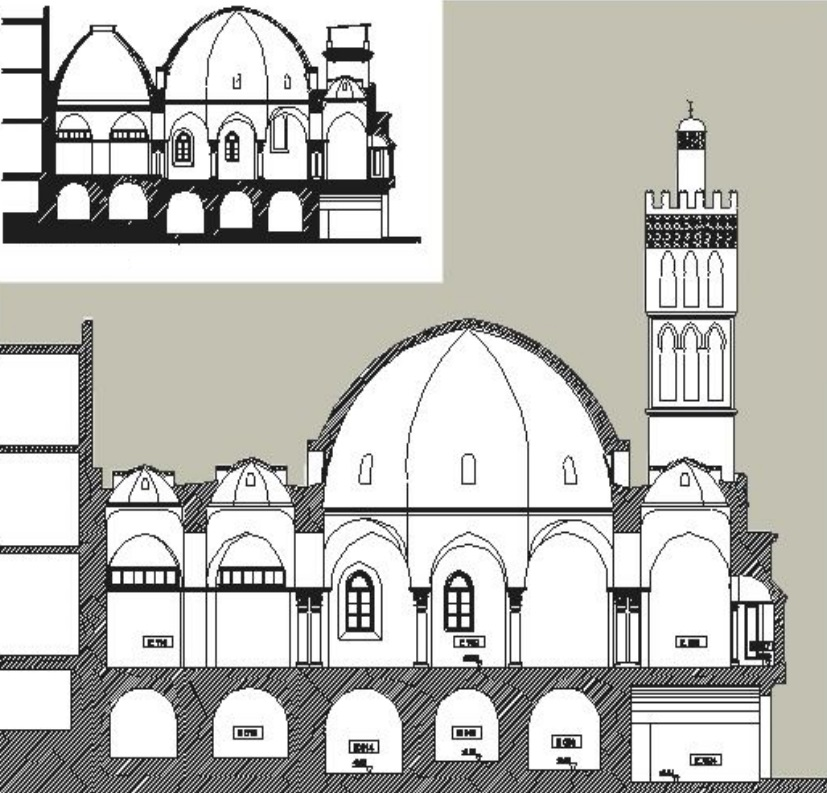
Elevation of the Ali Bitchin Mosque (after recent restoration of the original floor plan), built in 1622, showing the main dome and side galleries with smaller domes

The oldest surviving mosque from the Ottoman period in Algeria is the Ali Bitchin (or 'Ali Bitshin) Mosque in Algiers, commissioned by an admiral of the same name, a convert of Italian origin, in 1622. The mosque is built on top of a raised platform and was once associated with various annexes including a hospice, a hammam, and a mill. A minaret and public fountain stand at its northeast corner. The interior prayer hall is centered around a square space covered by a large octagonal dome supported on four large pillars and pendentives. This space is surrounded on all four sides by galleries or aisles each covered by a line of smaller domes. On the west side of the central space this gallery is two bays deep (i.e. composed of two aisles instead of one), while on the other sides, including on the side of the mihrab, the galleries are just one bay deep. The mosque was converted by the French into a church in 1834 and modified, but after Algerian independence it was converted back to a mosque and its original floor plan reconstructed. The Ketchaoua Mosque, which was originally founded in the early 17th century, was rebuilt by Baba Hassan in 1794 with a floor plan nearly identical to the Ali Bitchin Mosque. In 1832, it was converted to a cathedral and from 1848 it was radically remodeled, resulting in its very different form and appearance today. Several other mosques in Algiers have (or had) a similar floor plan: the Safir Mosque, rebuilt in 1826, the al-Sai'da (or al-Sayyida) Mosque, built by Muhammad Ibn 'Uthman (r. 1766–1791) and demolished by the French in 1832, and two other mosques built in or near the qasba by Hussein Dey right after his accession to power in 1818.

The particular design of these mosques, with a large central dome flanked by lines of smaller domes on each side, was unprecedented in the Maghreb before its appearance in 17th-century Algiers. The use of a large central dome, and other features such as having foundations on a raised platform, is a clear connection with Ottoman architecture. However, the plan is quite different from the mosques of metropolitan Ottoman architecture in Istanbul and other Ottoman dynastic sites. Some scholars, such as Georges Marçais, suggested that the architects or patrons could have been influenced by Ottoman-era mosques built in the Levantine provinces of the empire, where many of the rulers of Algiers had originated.

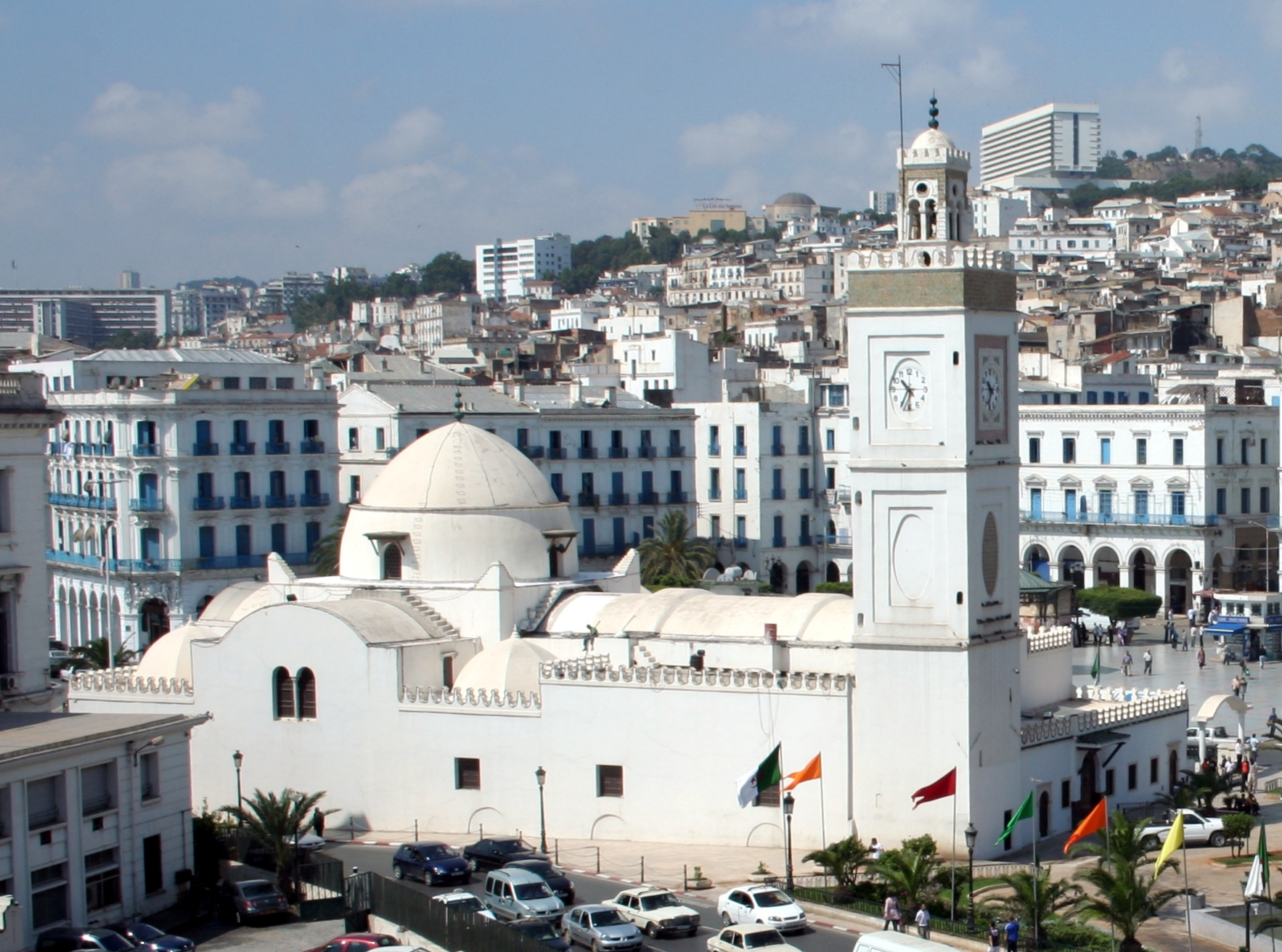
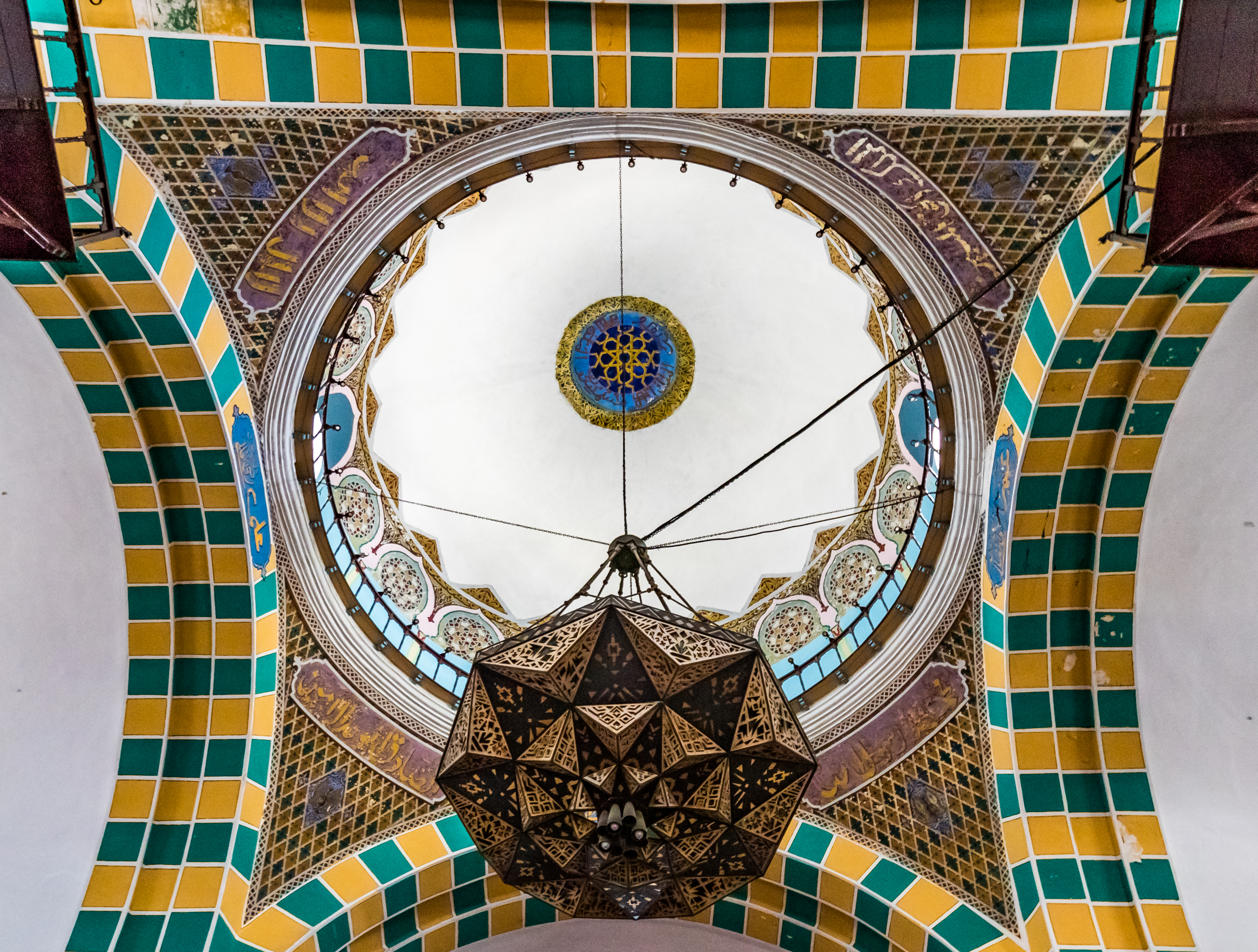
The New Mosque (Djama' el-Djedid) in Algiers (1660): exterior view (left) and interior view of the main dome (right)

The most notable example of Ottoman architecture in Algeria is the New Mosque (Djamaa el-Djedid) in Algiers. It was built in 1660–1661 by al-Hajj Habib, one of the Janissaries in Algiers, and became one of the most important Hanafi mosques in the city. The mosque has a round central dome supported by four pillars, but instead of being surrounded by smaller domes it is flanked on four sides by wide barrel-vaulted spaces, with small domed or vaulted bays occupying the corners between these barrel vaults. The barrel-vaulted space on the north side of the dome (the entrance side) is elongated, giving the main vaulted spaces of the mosque a cross-like configuration resembling a Christian cathedral. The mosque's minaret has a traditional form with a square shaft surmounted by a small lantern structure. Its simple decoration includes tilework; the clock faces visible today were added at a later period. Inside the mosque is a raised platform, analogous to a müezzin mahfili in Ottoman mosques, standing under the main dome. The mosque's marble minbar is Ottoman in form and decorated with Italianate details. The mihrab has a more traditional western Islamic form, with a horseshoe-arch shape and stucco decoration, although the decoration around it is crowned with Ottoman-style half-medallion and quarter-medallion shapes. The mosque's overall design and its details thus attest to an apparent mix of Ottoman, Maghrebi, and European influences. As the architect is unknown, Jonathan Bloom suggests that it could have been a local architect who simply took the general idea of Ottoman mosque design as a starting point but developed his own interpretation of it.

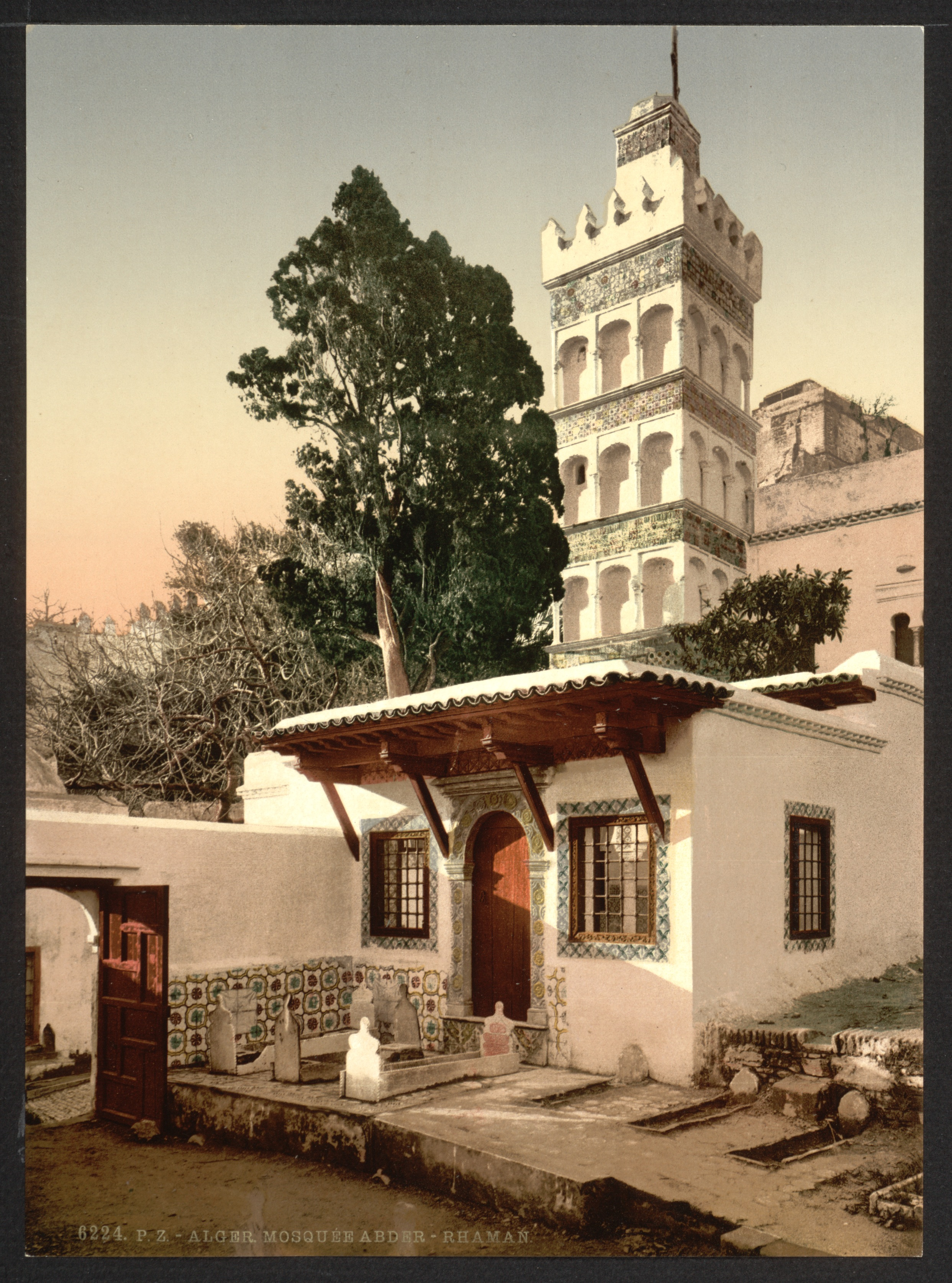
The minaret of the Zawiya of Sidi Abd ar-Rahman in Algiers, built in the late 18th century (photo circa 1899)

As in the rest of the Maghreb, the tombs of major Muslim figures and Sufi saints were important religious sites. The tomb of Sidi Abd ar-Rahman al-Tha'alibi, a 15th-century Sufi scholar of great importance to Algiers, was covered by a vaulted mausoleum in 1611 which contained marble capitals and columns distinctly related to those of Saadian architecture in Marrakesh, suggesting that it may have resembled the Saadian Tombs and had some connection with architects from Marrakesh. This was rebuilt in 1696 into the current zawiya (religious funerary complex), which contained the mausoleum, a mosque, a hostel, and ablutions facilities, among other elements. However, contrary to common practice in other parts of the Maghreb, the complex does not include a madrasa. The new mausoleum has a more Ottoman-style dome similar to those of other mosques mentioned above. A new minaret was also constructed with a unique design: a square shaft whose exterior is wrapped in a three-level arcade.

Unlike contemporary dynasties in neighbouring Tunisia and Morocco, and unlike the earlier Zayyanids of Tlemcen, the rulers of Algiers built no major madrasas in their capital. Some were still built elsewhere. One of the governors of Constantine, Salah Bey (d. 1792), built two madrasas in that city: the Madrasa of Sidi el-Kettani in 1775 and the Madrasa of Sidi al-Akhdar in 1779. Although not as elaborate as earlier medieval madrasas in the Maghreb, one of the madrasas is distinguished by the attachment of a mausoleum containing the remains of Salah Bey and some of his family. The practice of attaching the mausoleum of a ruler or political patron to a madrasa he founded was common in Cairo to the east, but uncommon in the Maghreb.

=== Palace and domestic architecture ===
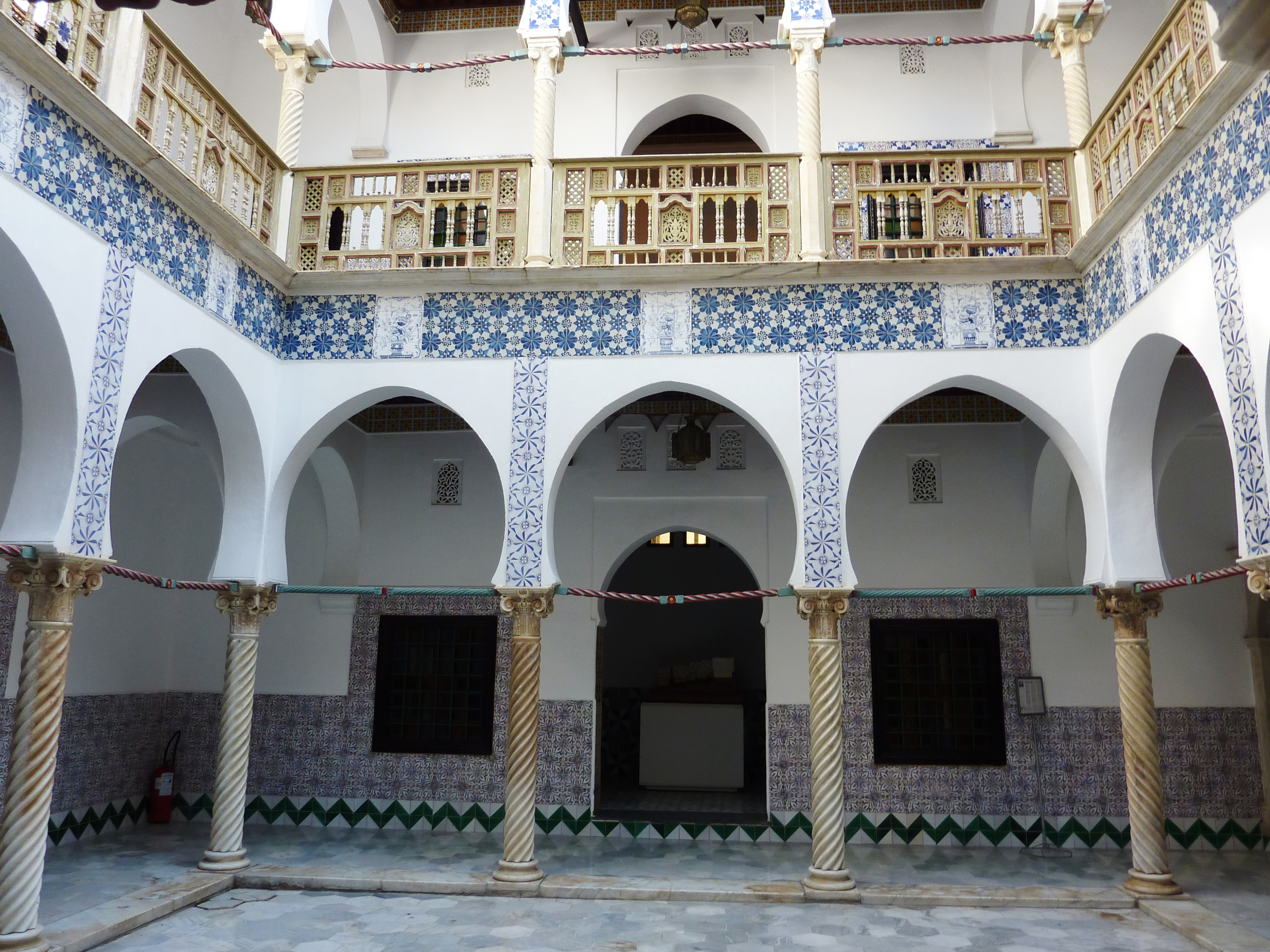
Example of a traditional internal courtyard in the Palais des Rais (originally built in the 16th century but recently restored)

The residential palace of the ruler in Algiers, the Janina or Jenina ('Little Garden'), was situated at the center of a larger palatial complex known as the Dar as-Sultan in the lower part of the city. This complex served as the ruling palace until 1816, when the Dey moved to the qasba following a British bombardment of the city that year. According to some historical descriptions, the complex included two major courtyards. The second courtyard was smaller than the first one but contained at its center a large fountain with a square basin. In one corner of this courtyard a wide staircase gave access to a gallery that led towards the throne of the ruler of Algiers. The gallery was lined with marble columns on either side, paved with ceramic tiles, and contained at its center a jet fountain with an octagonal basin. Next to the palace was an official mosque, the al-Sa'ida Mosque, built by Muhammad Ibn 'Uthman in the 18th century (as mentioned above). After the French conquest in 1830, however, most of the lower city of Algiers, including the Dar al-Sultan and its mosque, was demolished and replaced with European style streets and buildings. As a result, most of the pre-19th-century historic fabric of the city remaining today is found in the upper city, now known as the Casbah (the name being applied generally rather than only to the former citadel).

Only one example of architecture from the Dar al-Sultan complex has survived today, the Dar 'Aziza Bint al-Bey, a small palace which was converted into the archbishop's residence during the colonial period. It is believed to have been built in the 16th century, though its surrounding environment has changed significantly. It was originally on a sloping site and had several stories. Its original ground floor, somewhat like a basement, contained storerooms, kitchens, stables, and shops along its exterior, but these have since disappeared and the floor above it has become the ground floor. The main building is a two-story structure centered around an internal square courtyard (the wast ad-dar or 'center of the house'). The courtyard is ringed on all four sides by a two-story gallery with pointed horseshoe arches supported on marble columns. Diverse ceramic tiles, carved stucco, lattice windows, and a fountain are used for decoration, with the decoration generally increasing in richness on the upper level. The rooms of the upper story are also grander and include the main reception hall. A grand staircase leads from the floor of this courtyard to an annex, the dwira (also transliterated as douira, meaning a smaller house or apartment), which was partly demolished in the 19th century. The grand staircase itself is unusual in North African domestic architecture of this period and suggests that the builders may have been familiar with European architecture.

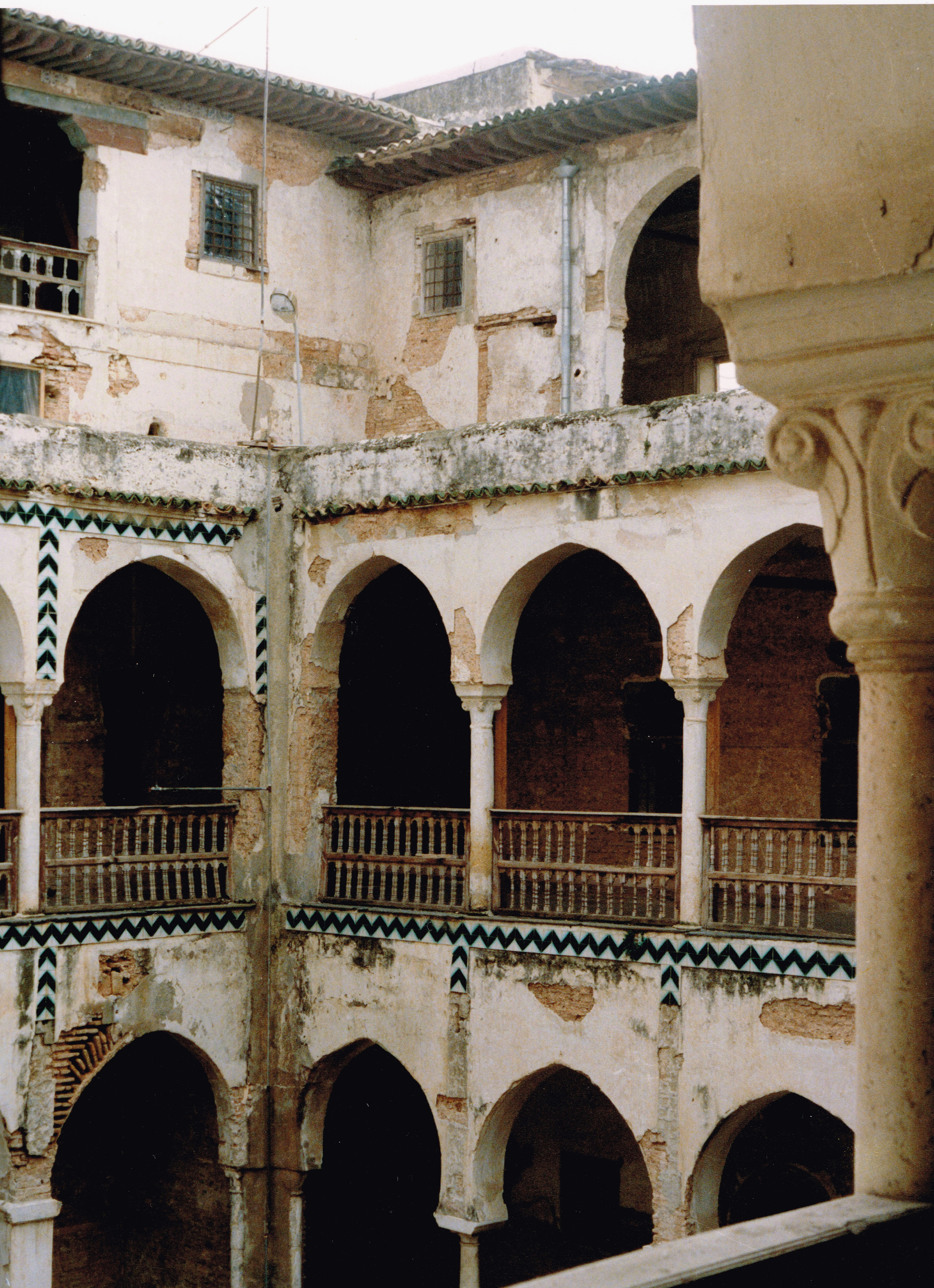
Interior courtyard in the Palace of the Dey in Algiers (1986 photo, before its restoration)

The upper citadel, the qasba, is better preserved than the Dar al-Sultan, but its character was more military than palatial. The fortress was begun on the orders of Oruç (or Aruj) Barbarossa in 1516 and was completed in 1590, replacing an older citadel situated slightly downhill. Until the 19th century, the qasba contained the largest janissary barracks in the city. It contained a mosque, warehouses, shops, and other buildings for military purposes. Its thick ramparts run a length of 530 metres, but were also integrated with the former city walls. A rounded bastion to the southwest helped to protect the city on this side. After Ali Khodja moved the residence of the Deys to the qasba in 1816, his successor, Hussein Dey (r. 1818–1830), further developed the citadel into a residence and administrative center. In addition to the warehouses, stables, and other military facilities, the citadel acquired a council room (diwan), a courtroom, and various government offices. A large octagonal building in the center of the citadel today was formerly a munitions factory. The Palace of the Dey, on the northwest side of the citadel, contained private apartments, including a harem section, as well as a treasury chamber, two mosques (the Dey Mosque and another mosque for the janissaries), a hammam, and kitchens. The most notable feature of the palace interior is a courtyard (the wast ad-dar) surrounded by a three-storey gallery. The area around the palace also contained two main gardens and an ostrich park.

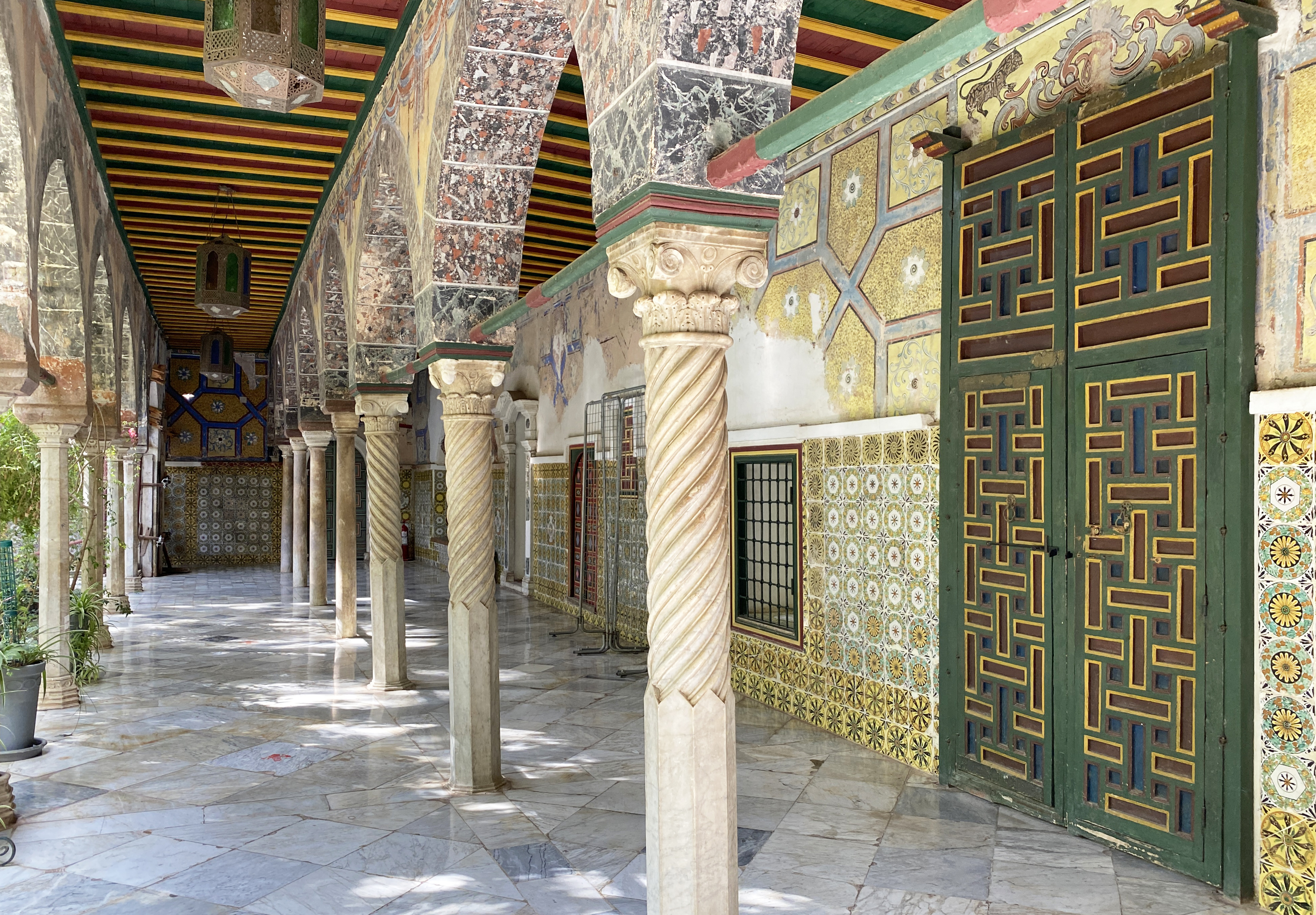
View of an interior gallery in the Palace of Ahmed Bey in Constantine (early 19th century)

A number of other palaces or wealthy residences from the Ottoman period have also been preserved in Algeria, generally sharing some similar characteristics such as an entrance hall or corridor (called the sqifa), a wast ad-dar (central interior courtyard), a multi-story layout, and a dwira annex. In large houses the major reception halls often had an arched alcove or small domed room at the back, called a bahw, which projects outward from the house and could be richly decorated. Some further examples of residences in Algiers are the Dar Mustapha Pasha, dated to 1799, and the residence known as the Palais des Rais (Palace of the Rais), dating from the 16th century. A number of suburban and countryside villas have also been preserved outside the walled city, again characterized by internal courtyards. Between 1826 and 1835 the independent ruler Ahmed Bey (also known as Hajj Ahmed) in Constantine, built a palace for himself that includes courtyards and two large internal gardens.

== Colonial era ==
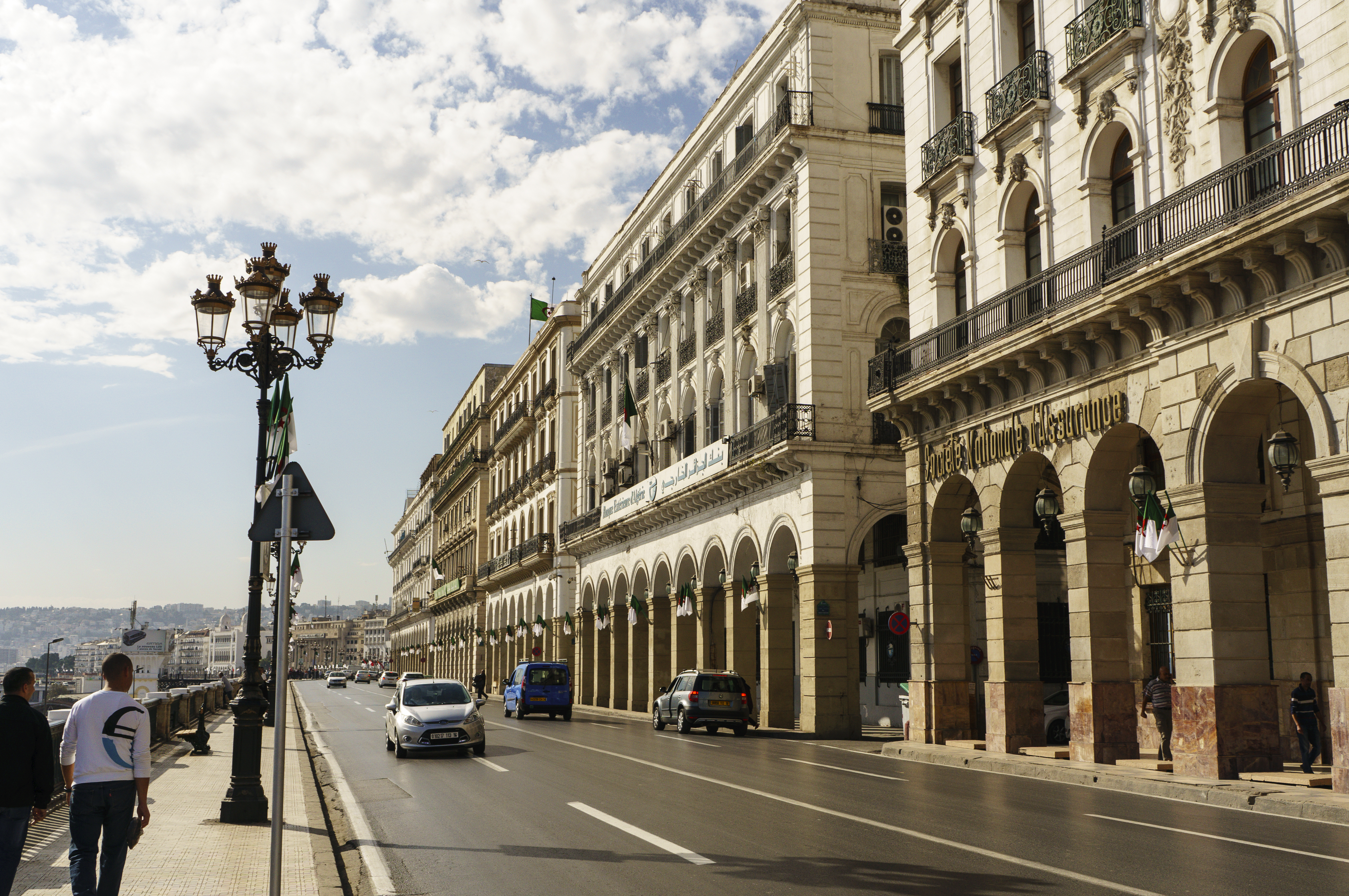
Waterfront of Algiers

=== Early colonial era ===
In 1830, France invaded Algeria and began its colonial rule of the nation. Early colonial Algerian architecture was characterized by French efforts at restructuring the Islamic city via military engineering. Motivated by perceived military and cultural supremacy over their colonial subjects, the early French administration sought to radically transform the existing urban structures of Algerian cities to better allow for the logistics of military occupation and culturally mirror those of France.

The first buildings constructed by the French administration largely referenced a number of established European styles including Baroque Revival and Byzantine Revival. At the end of the 19th century and the beginning of the 21st century,

The majority of French colonial urban planners and architects viewed themselves as tasked with the duty of remodeling Algerian cities to mirror the regularity, symmetry, and public facilities characteristic of the French homeland; colonial governments designed new developments with straight lines and right angles and established numerous public facilities including hospitals and post offices.

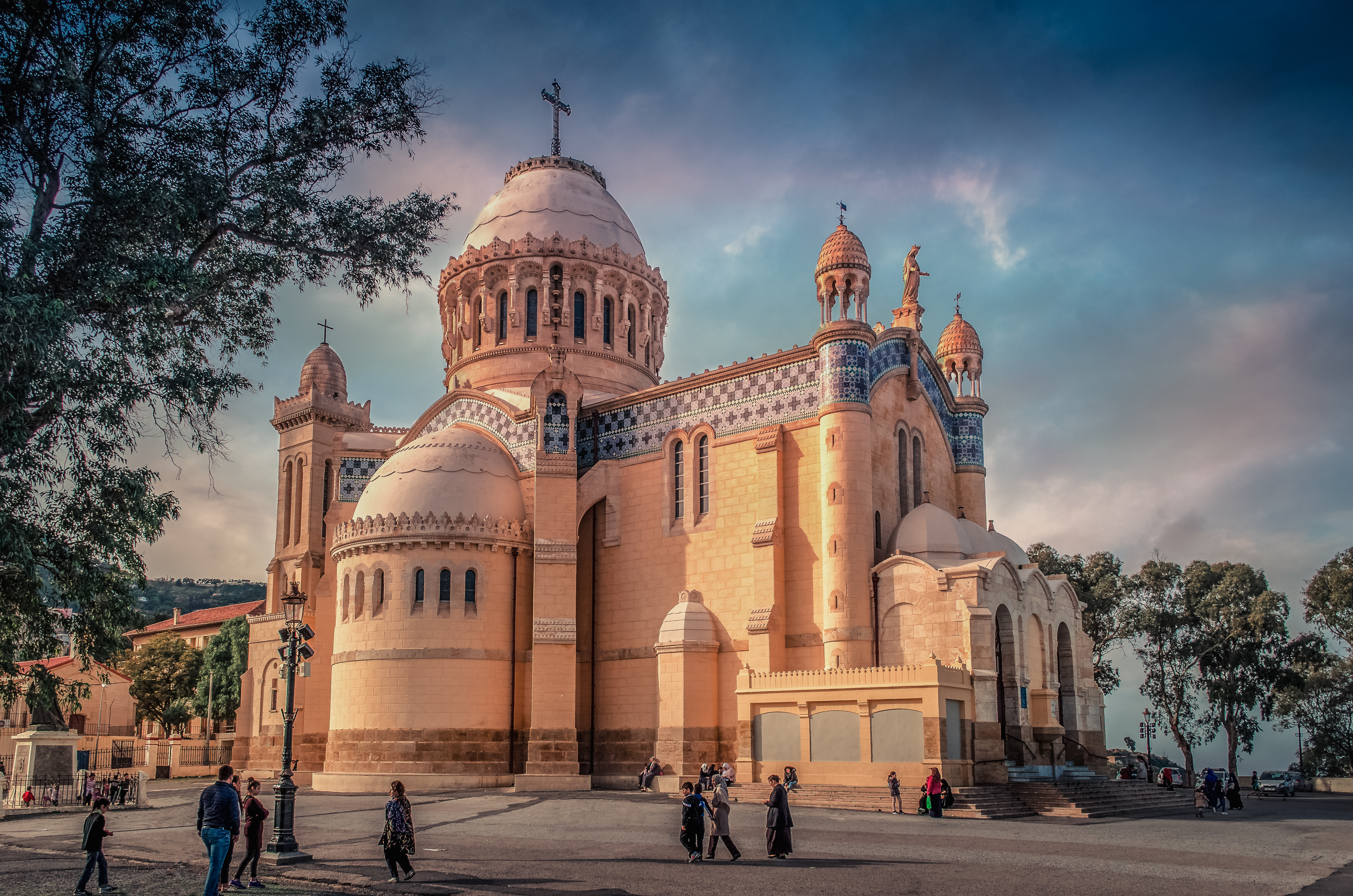
Notre Dame d'Afrique (J. E. Fromageau, 1858) is a prominent example of Byzantine Revival architecture in Algeria

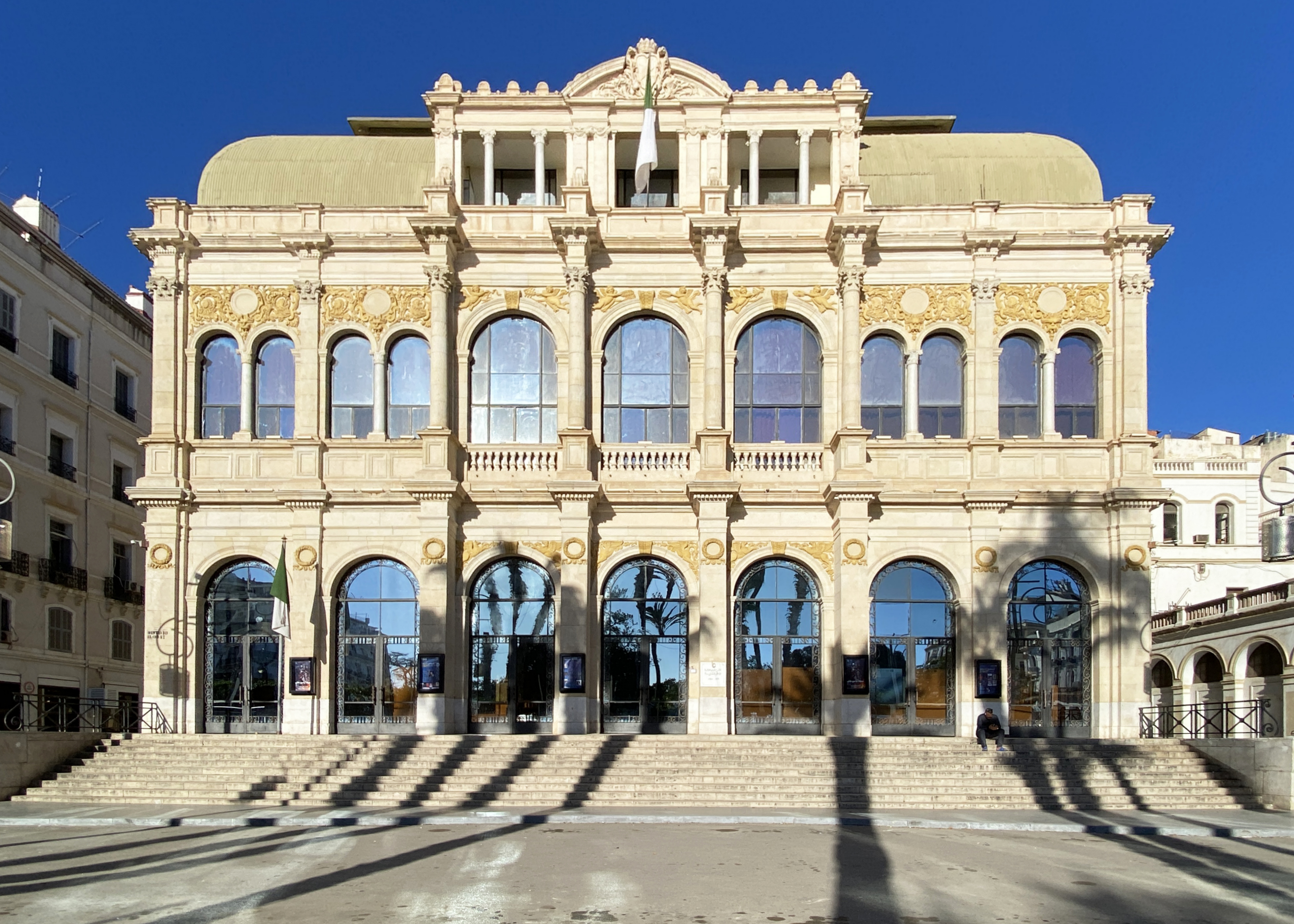
The Theatre municipal (Charles Frédéric Chassériau, 1850) was built in the Baroque Revival style

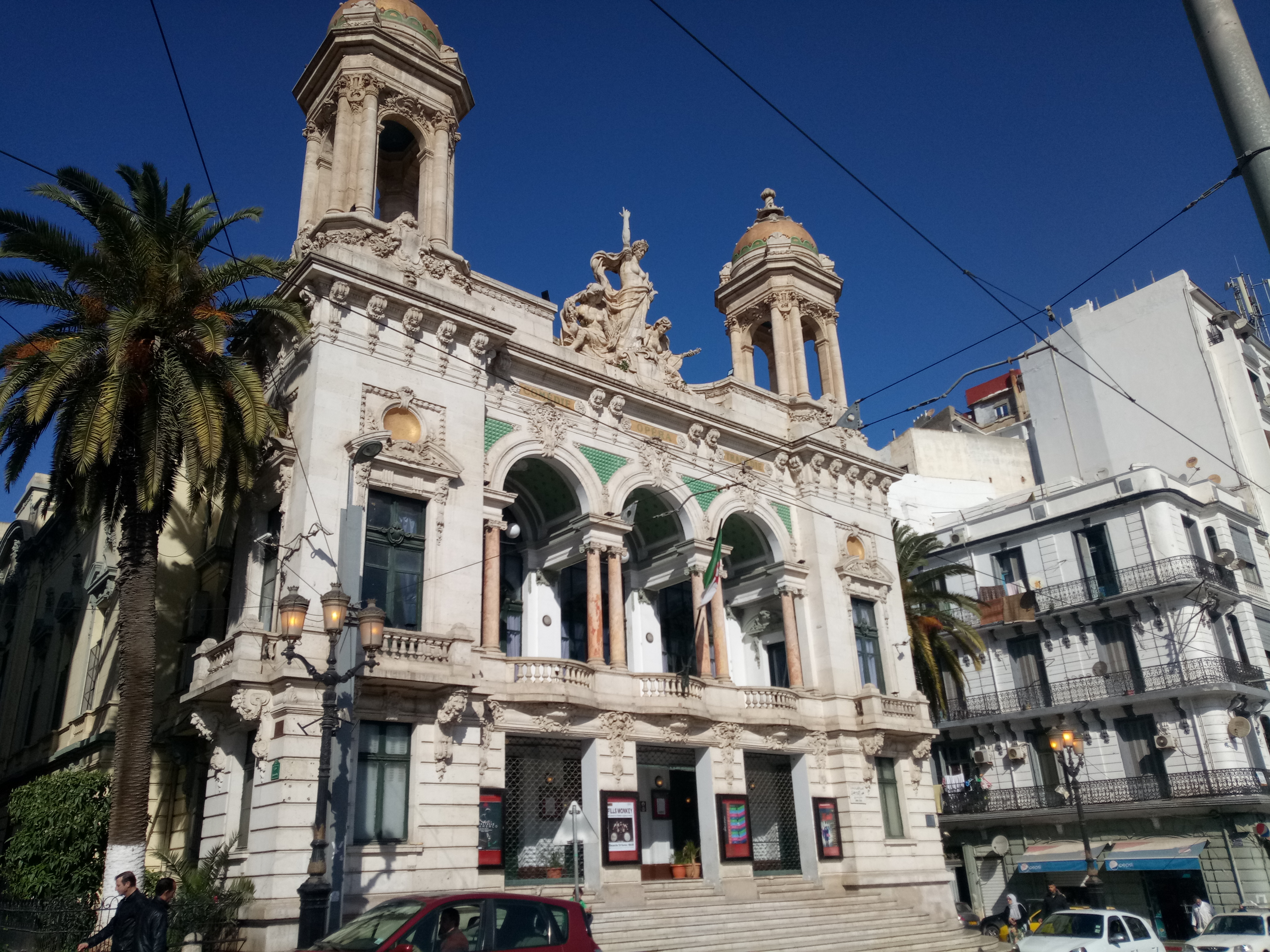
Regional Theatre of Oran

=== Arabisance ===
Algerian colonial architecture saw a shift in the early 1900s with the 1903 appointment of Charles Lutaud as Governor General. Lutaud advocated for the adoption of the colonial cultural policy of Algerian "association" with France over Algerian assimilation, dictating that public buildings be constructed in the hybrid Moorish Revival Arabisance style. In reference to Lutaud's policies, the combination of Moorish architecture with European architectural styles in Algeria is sometimes referred to as the Jonnart style (French: Style Jonnart).

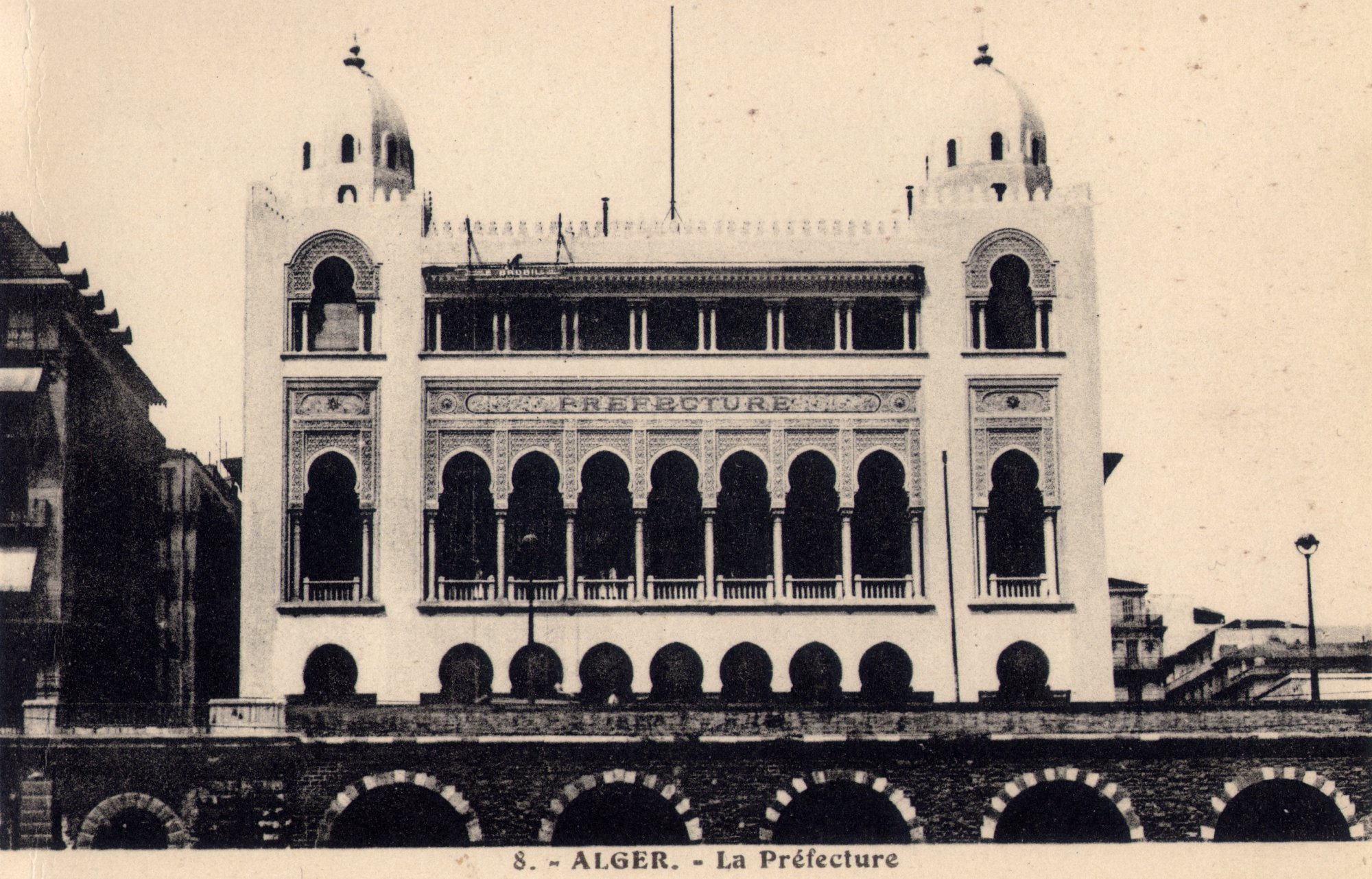
L'hôtel de Préfecture (Jules Voinot, 1908) in Algiers

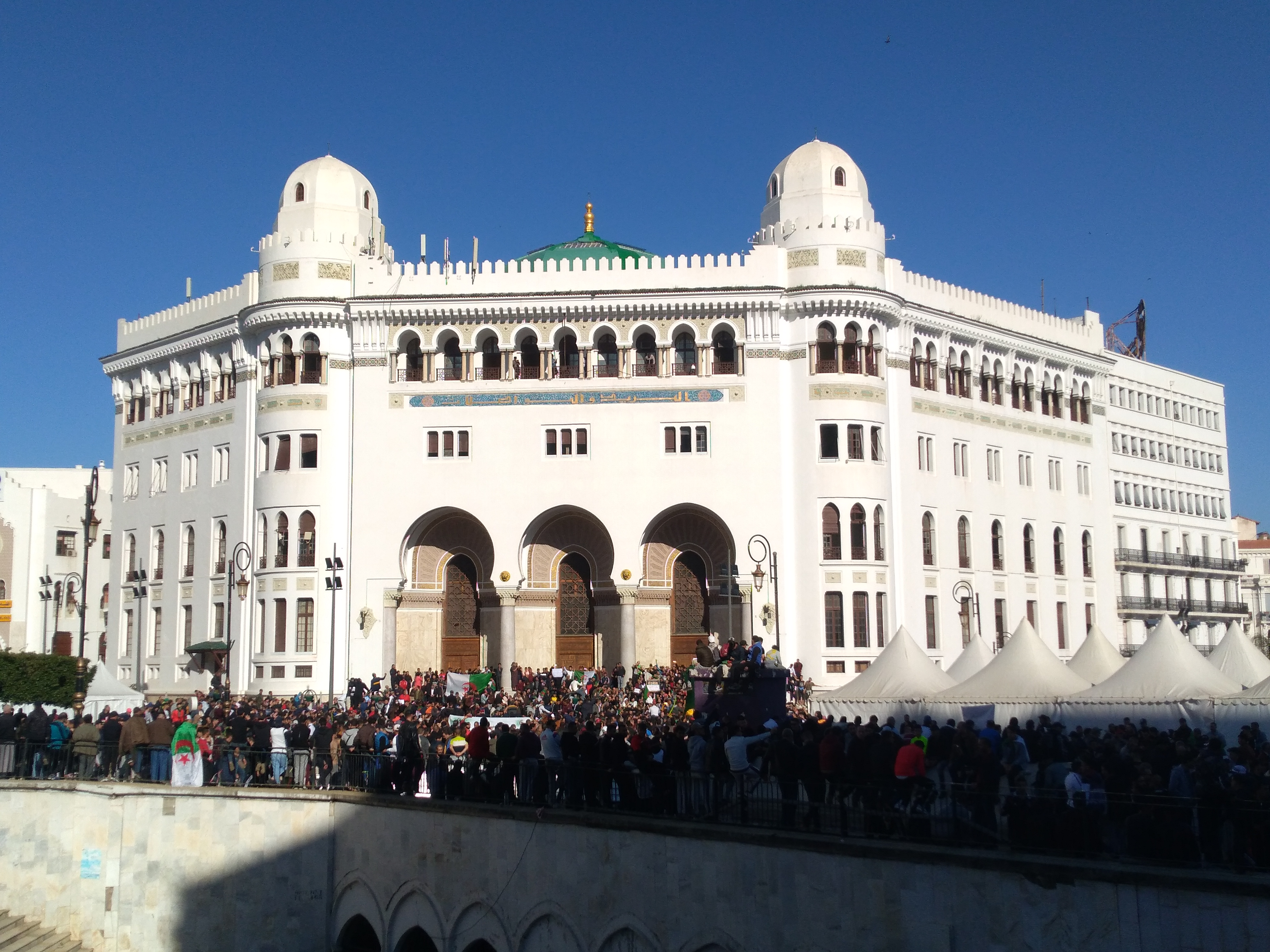
The Grande Poste d'Alger (J. Voinot and M. Tondoire, 1910)

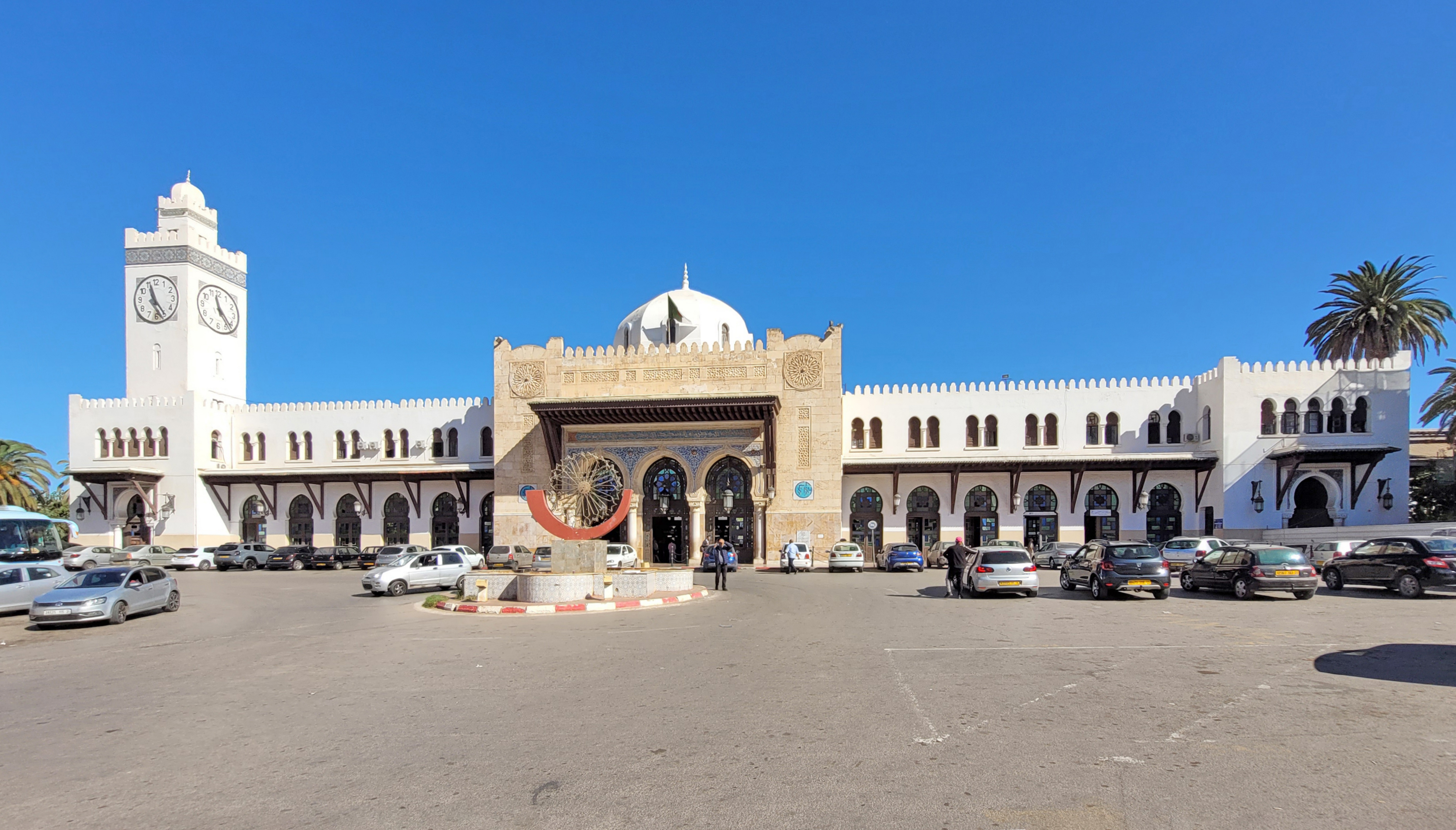
Oran railway station

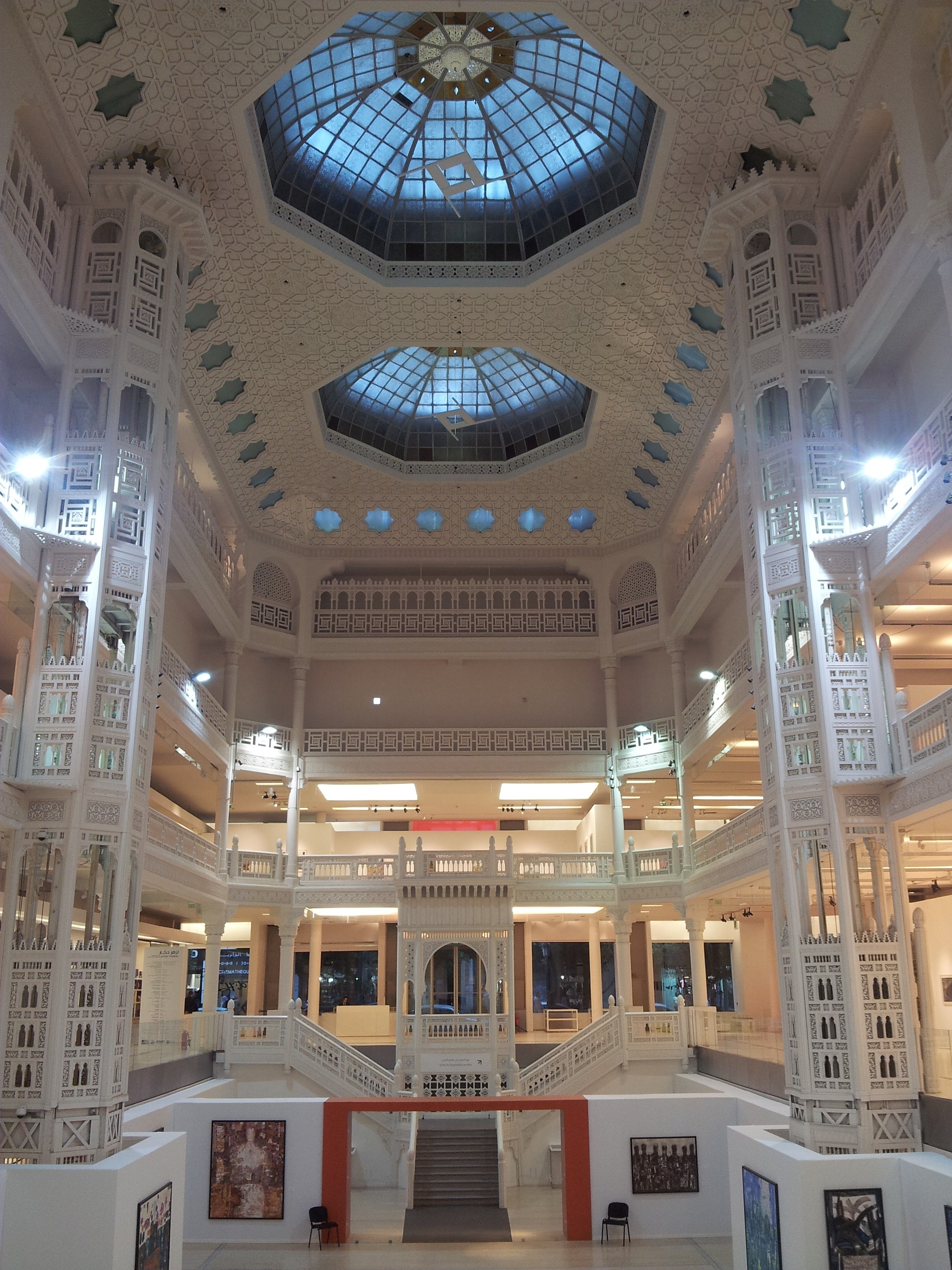
Interior of the museum of Modern Art (Algiers)

=== Modernism ===
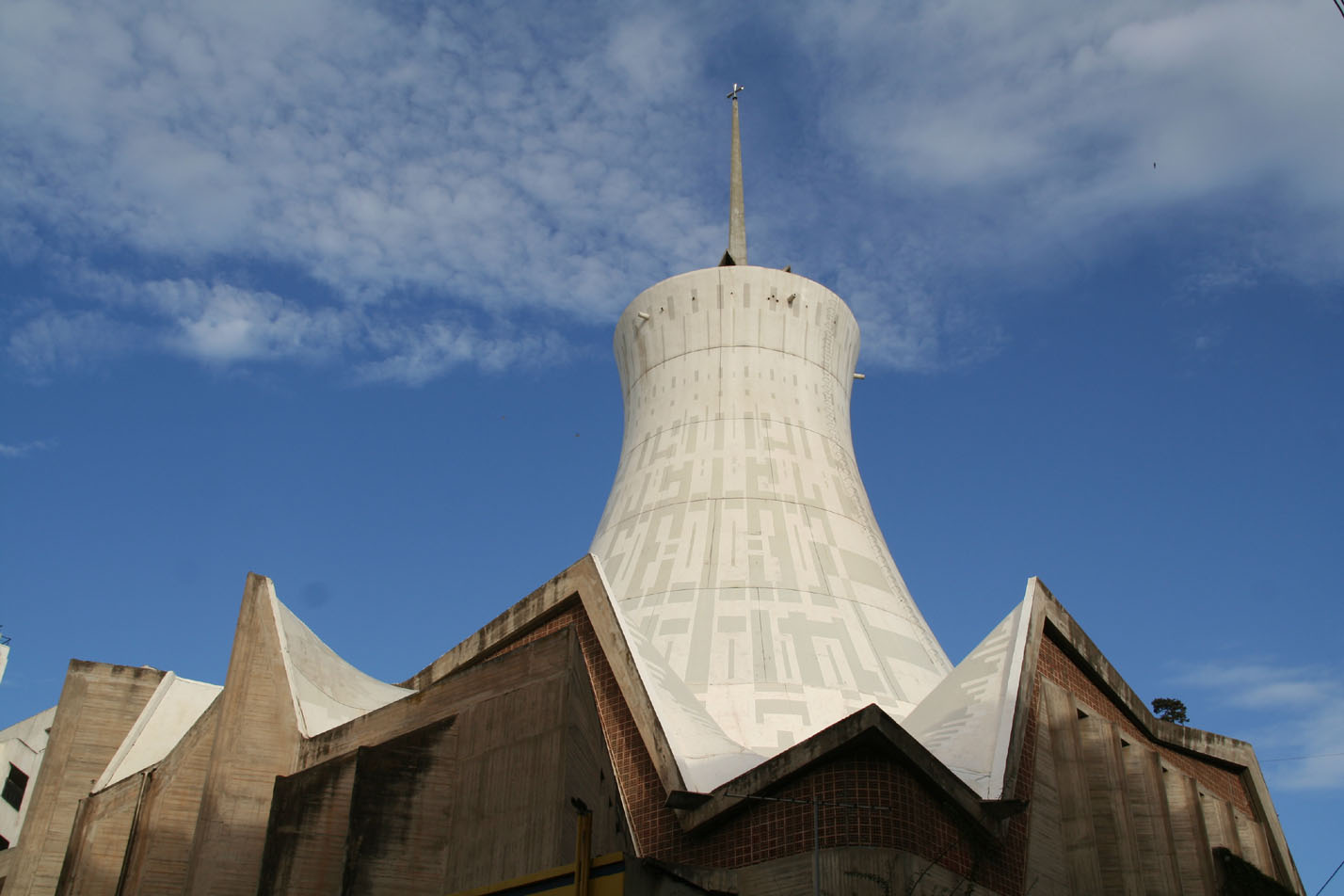
Cathédrale du Sacré-Cœur d'Alger (1956)

In the subsequent decades, the formation of a new colonial academic elite and the advent of Modernism together brought a period of architectural experimentation that pushed Algerian architecture even further away from established European styles. During this period, Algeria emerged as a viable location for modernist experimentation among French architects. the Government Palace in Algiers is representative of the era.

During the 1930s, Algiers served as a hub for architectural intellectuals. In 1932, the Algiers branch of the Society of Modern Architects (SAM, French: Société des architectes modernes) was formed; the society advocated for modernism, dictating its adherents to build within the "principles of modern aesthetics." The following year, the city hosted the first Exhibition of Urbanism and Modern Architecture (French: Exposition d'urbanisme et d'architecture moderne).

Algeria's nature as a "sandbox" for architectural experimentation is perhaps best exemplified in Le Corbusier's unimplemented 1932-1942 master plan for Algiers. The unofficial plan, entitled Plan Obus, included a series of developments built over the existing casbah around an ambitious set of elevated bridges and roadways.

During the 1950s and 60s, Algerian architecture, particularly that of Algiers, was characterized by new ideas of urban modernism influenced by Le Corbusier. Architects Bernard Zehrfuss, Louis Miquel and Fernand Pouillon constructed a number of major modernist buildings within Algeria in the decades including housing developments Diar El Mahcoul and Climat de France. During this era, French colonial architects encountered significant disagreement with one another over differing philosophies of racial integration between French and native Algerian residents.

Within the ultimate years of colonial Algeria, the French administration initiated the Constantine Plan of 1959 which pushed for increased development of social housing projects, particularly those for residents of slums (bidonvilles). Dubbed cites de recasement (relocation cities) and millions, these developments have been criticized for allegedly providing residents poorer living conditions than their original bidonvilles.

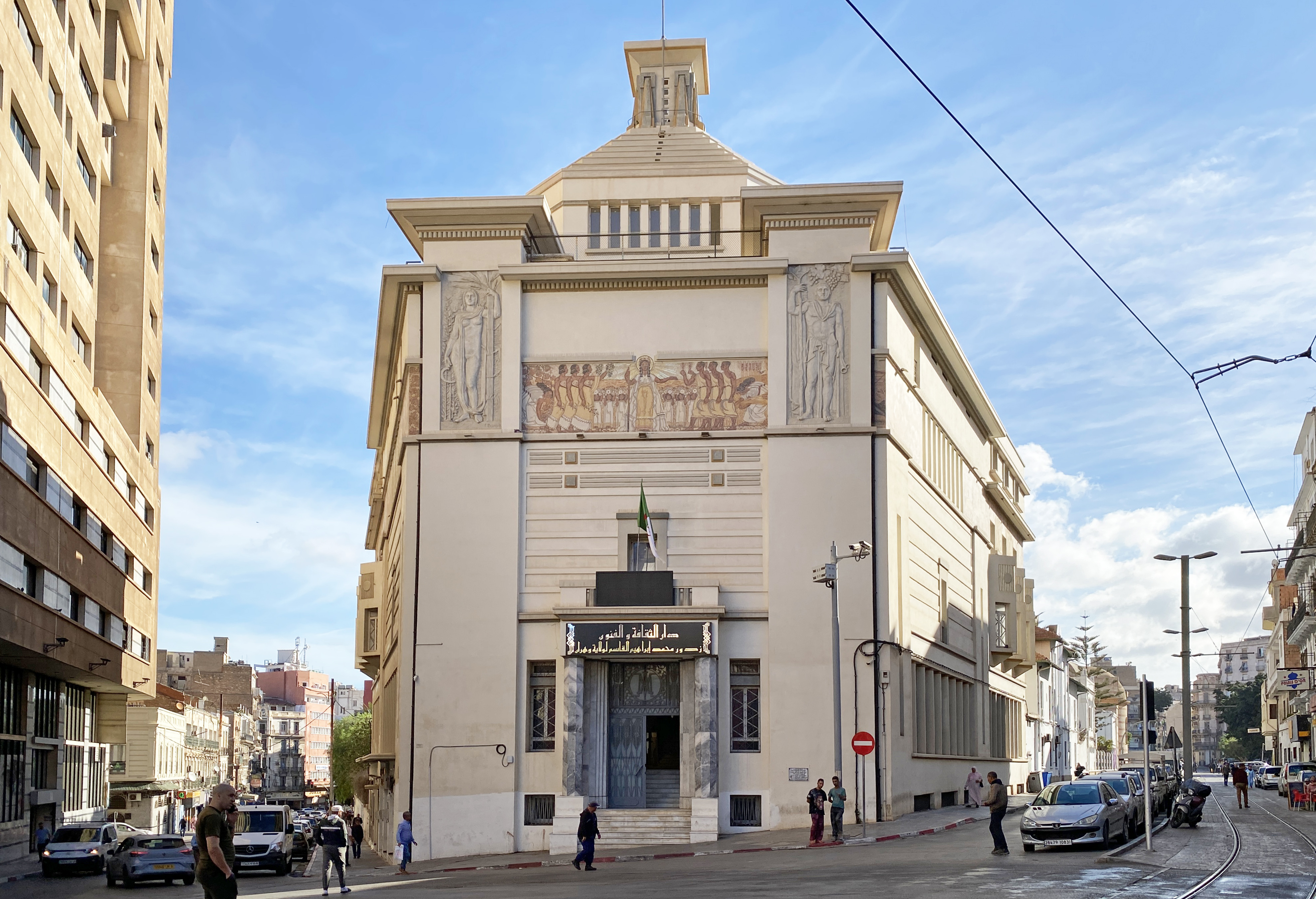
The Culture palace of Oran (1920-1930)

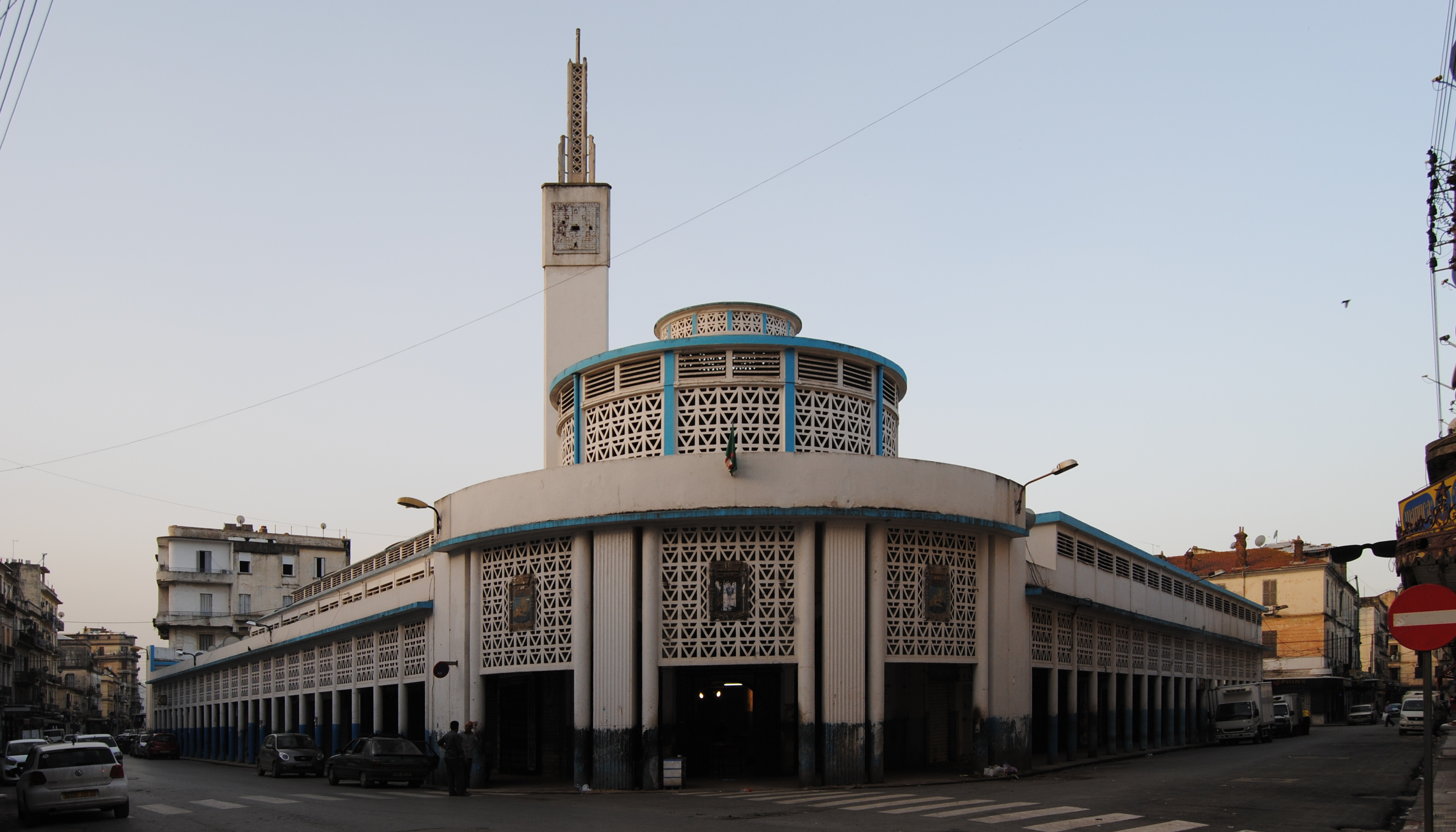
Covered market of Annaba (1936-1938), one of the early manifestations of modern art between the two world wars at the city level

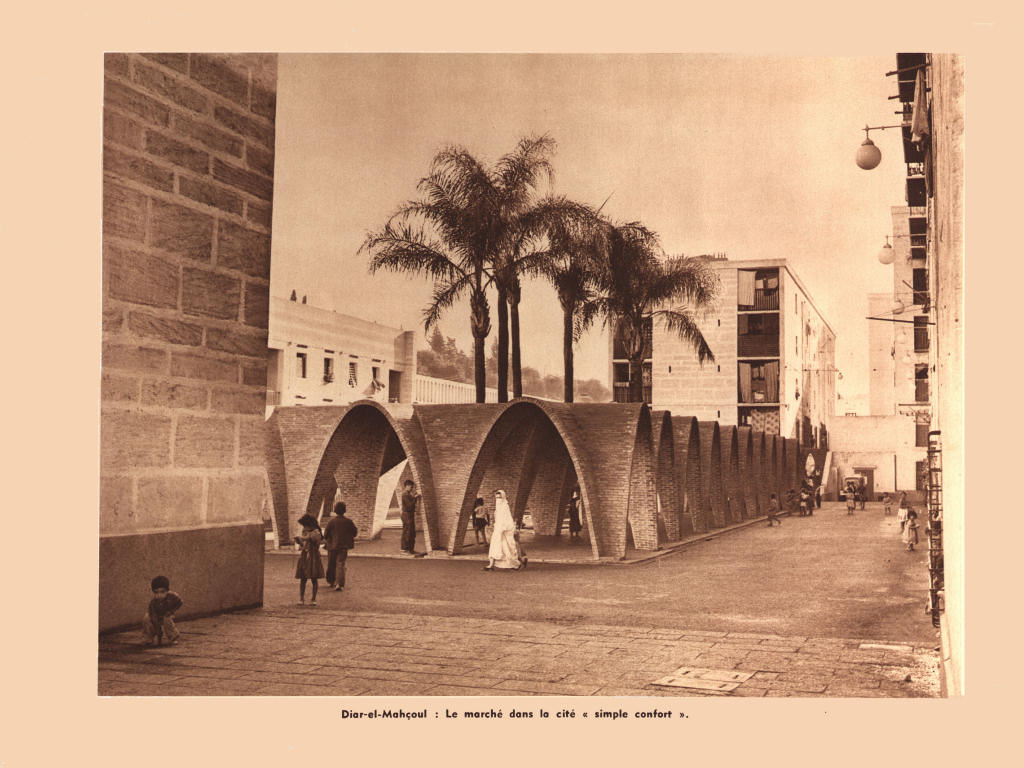
The architecture of Fernand Pouillon's Diar el Mahçoul sought to reinforce a sentiment of French-Algerian cooperation amid growing colonial unrest

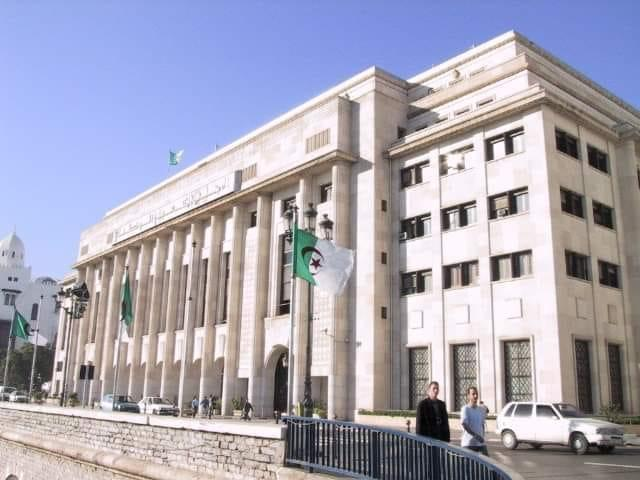
People's National Assembly building (Algiers), a compact building in late Art Deco or Stripped Classicism style.

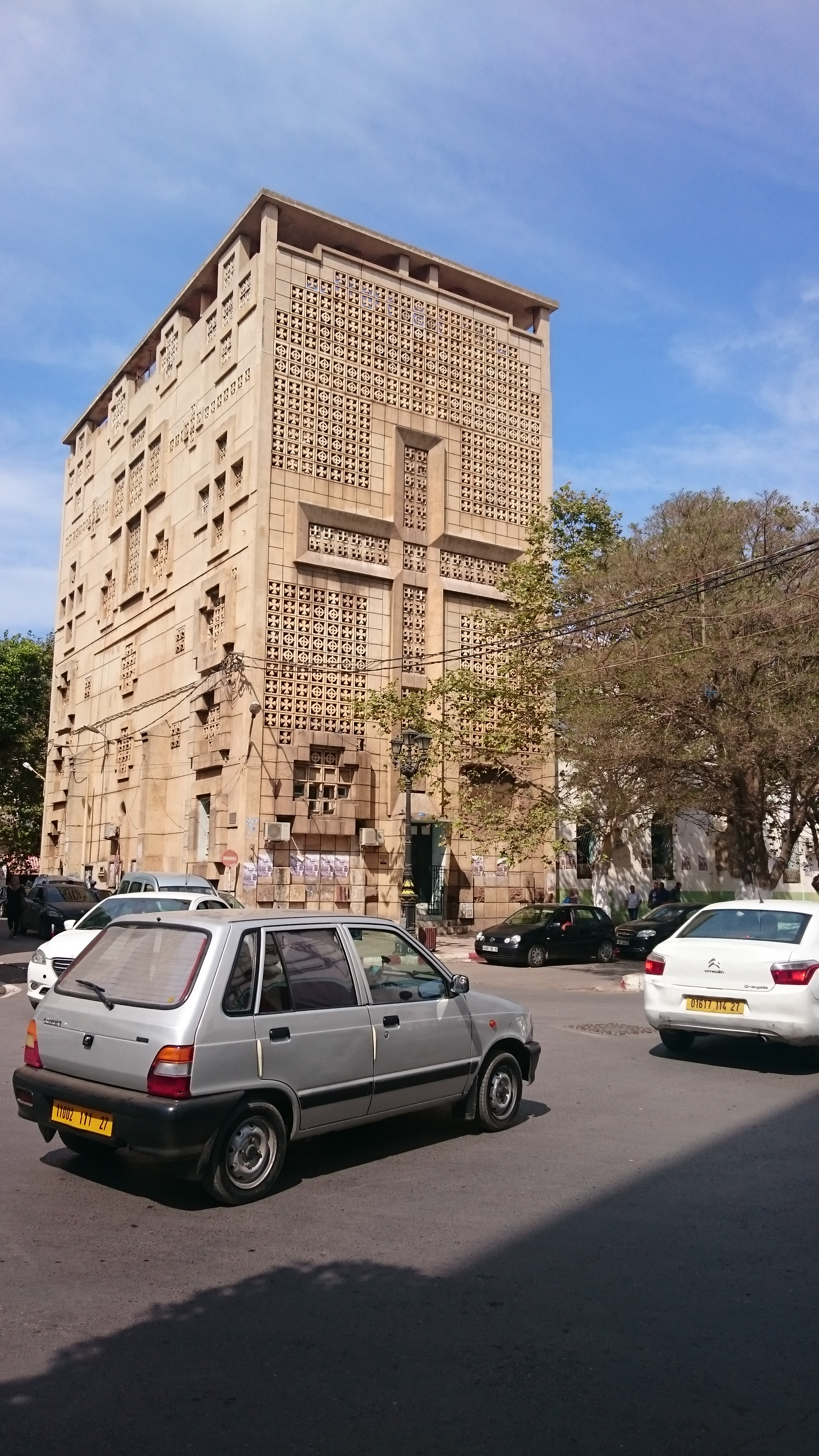
Church Saint-Jean-Baptiste of Mostaganem, built in 1953 by André Coron

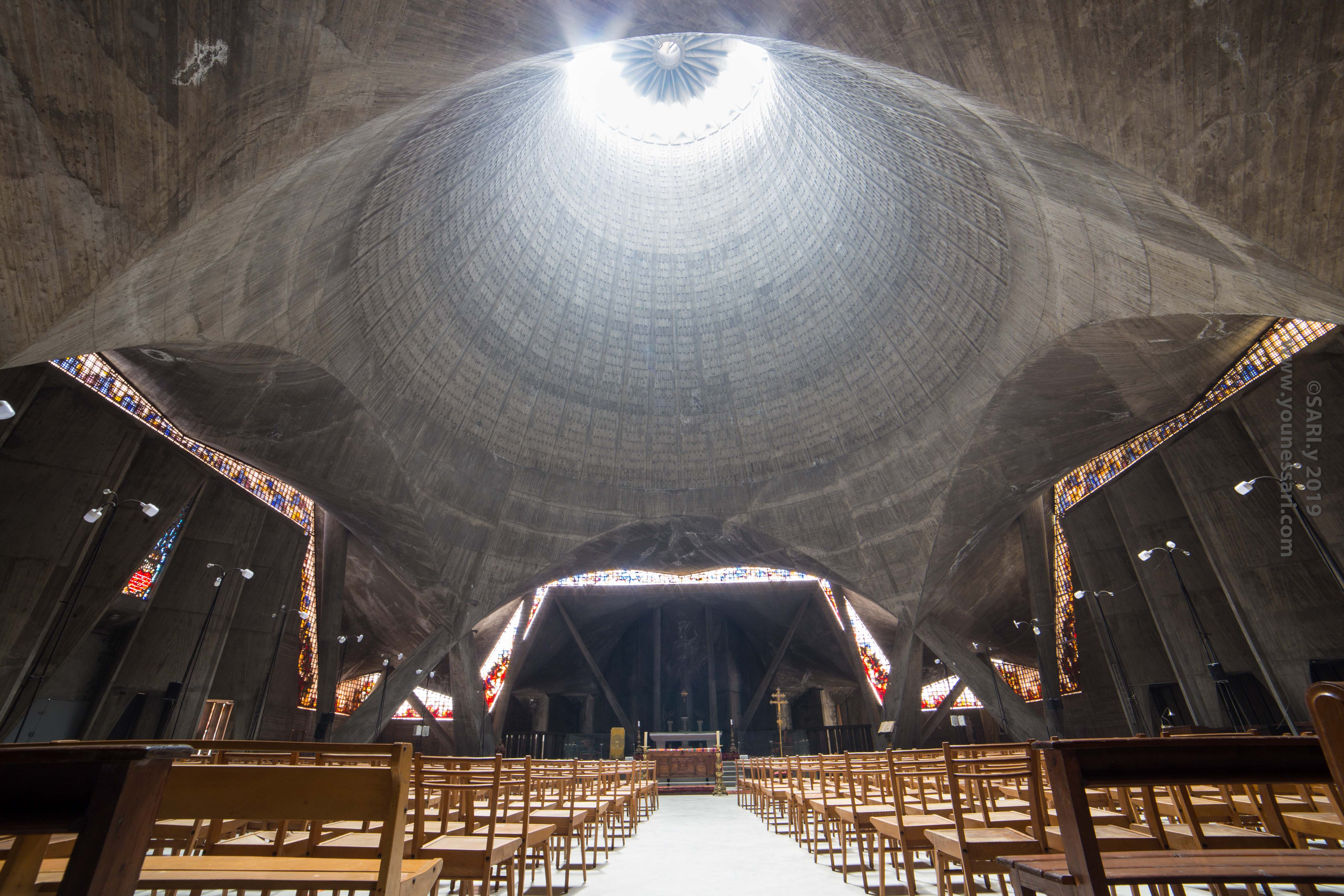
Cathédrale du Sacré-Cœur d'Alger (Paul Herbé and Jean Le Couteur, 1956) is an example of late colonial modernism in Algiers

== Post colonial era ==
Immediately following Algerian independence in 1962, a significant effort was made by the nation's new authority to decolonize through the eradication of French impacts upon Algeria; however, few architects within the country were prepared to design within a still ambiguous national identity divorced from the nation's history of colonization. Architect Abderrahmane Bouchama served as a key figure in the subsequent process of development of a distinct Algerian architectural identity, releasing a series of writings including his 1966 book L'Arceau qui chante, that addressed the subject.

=== 20th century ===
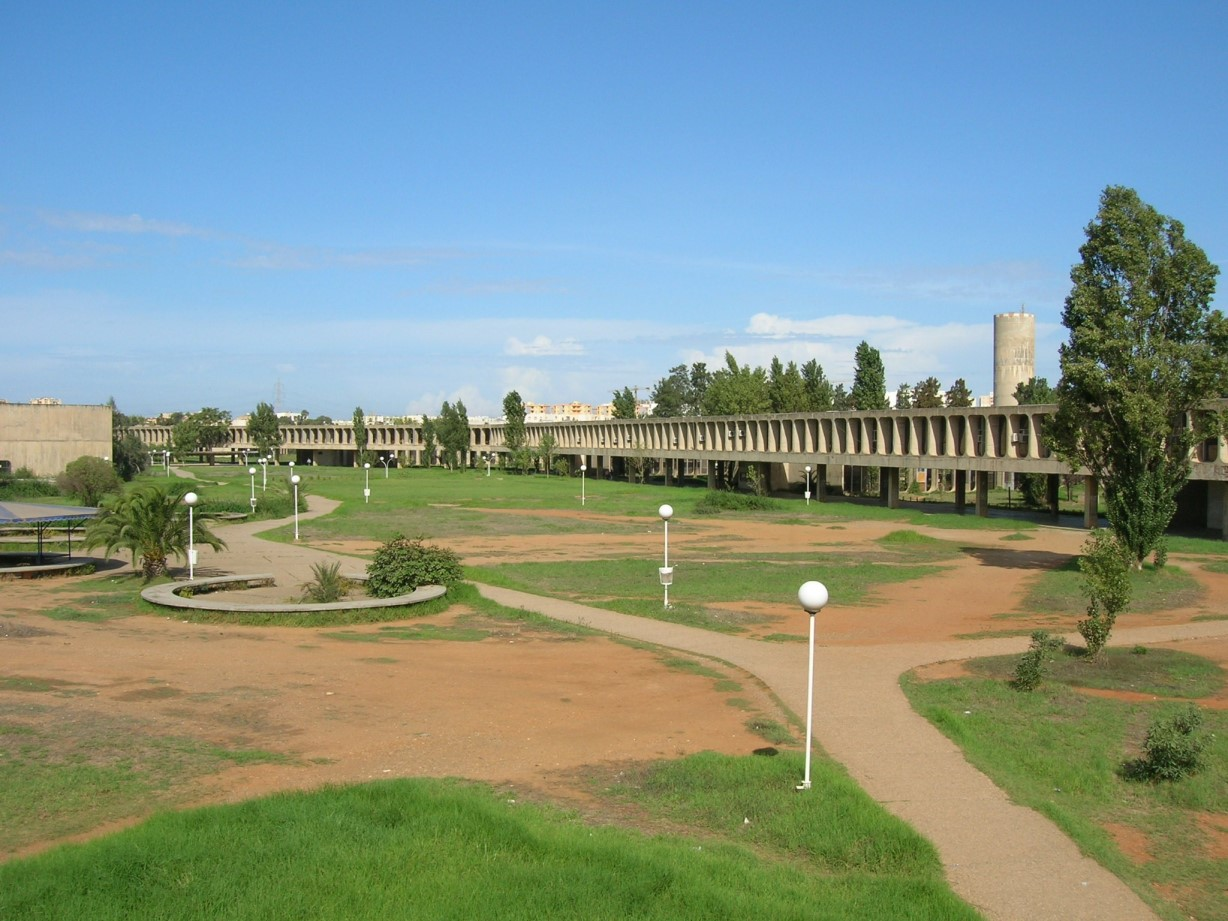
University of Sciences and Technology Houari Boumediene (Oscar Niemeyer, 1968)

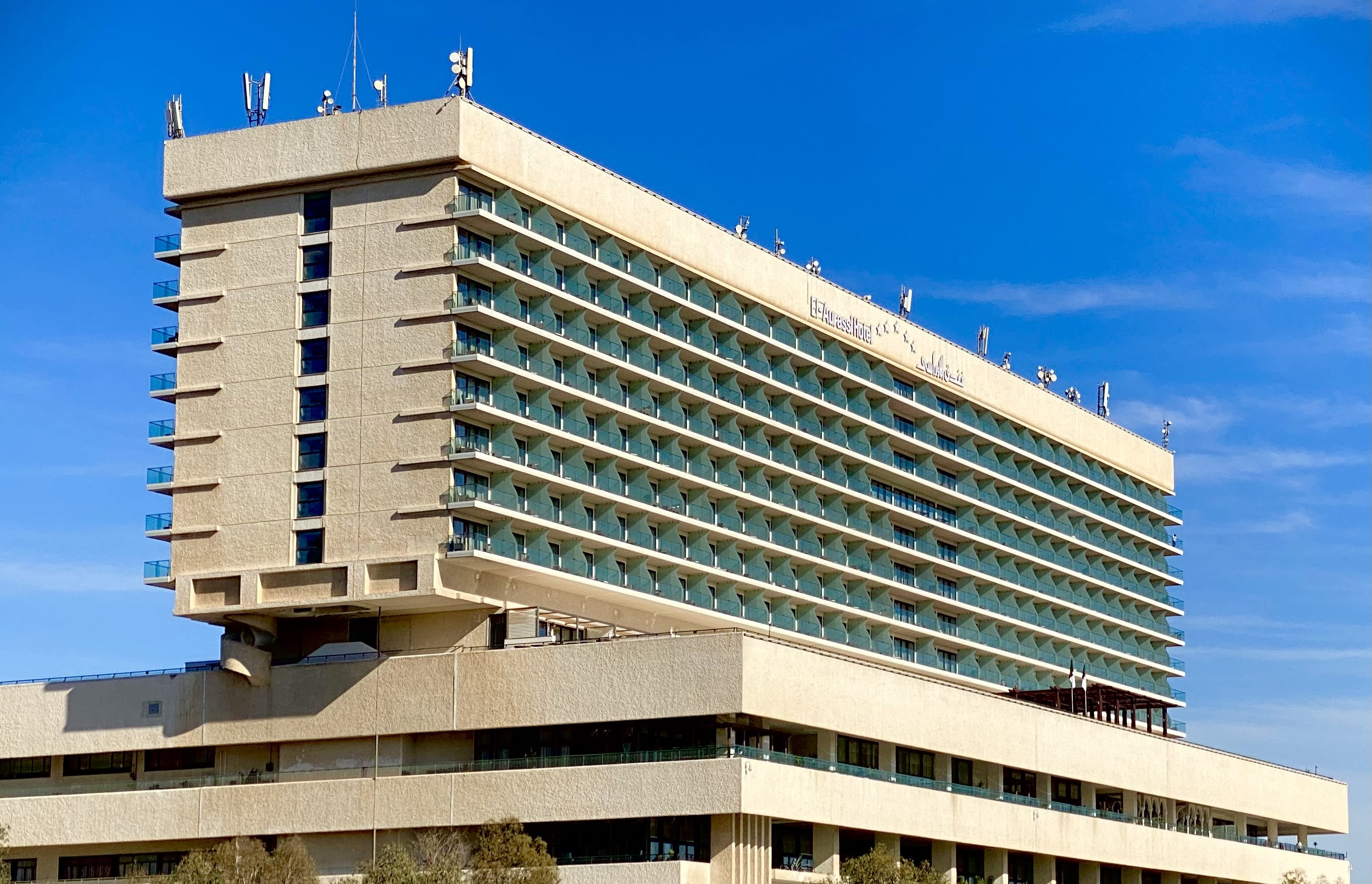
El Aurassi Hotel (Luigi Moretti, 1975)

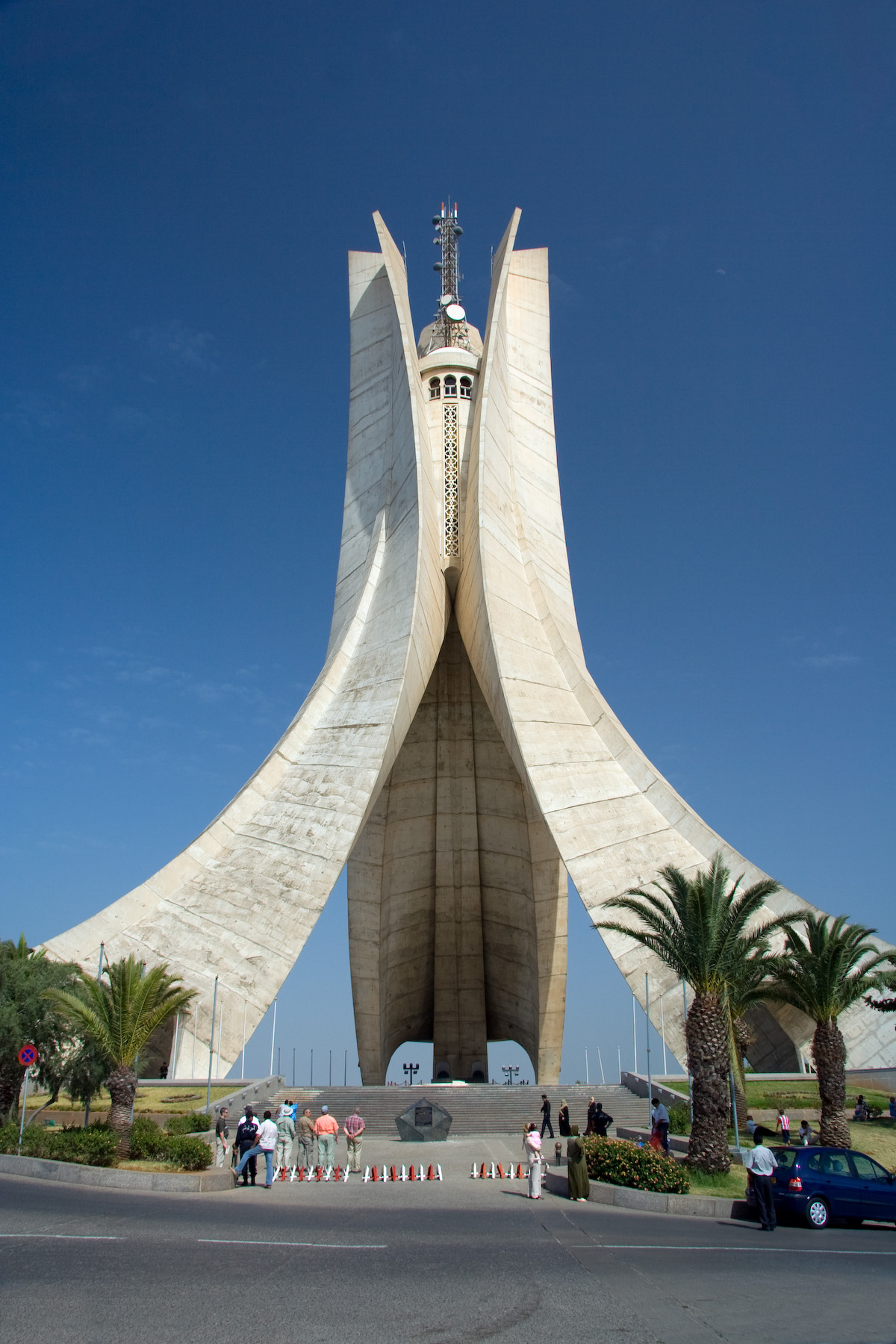
Martyrs' Memorial, Algiers (Bachir Yelles and Marian Konieczny, 1981-1982)

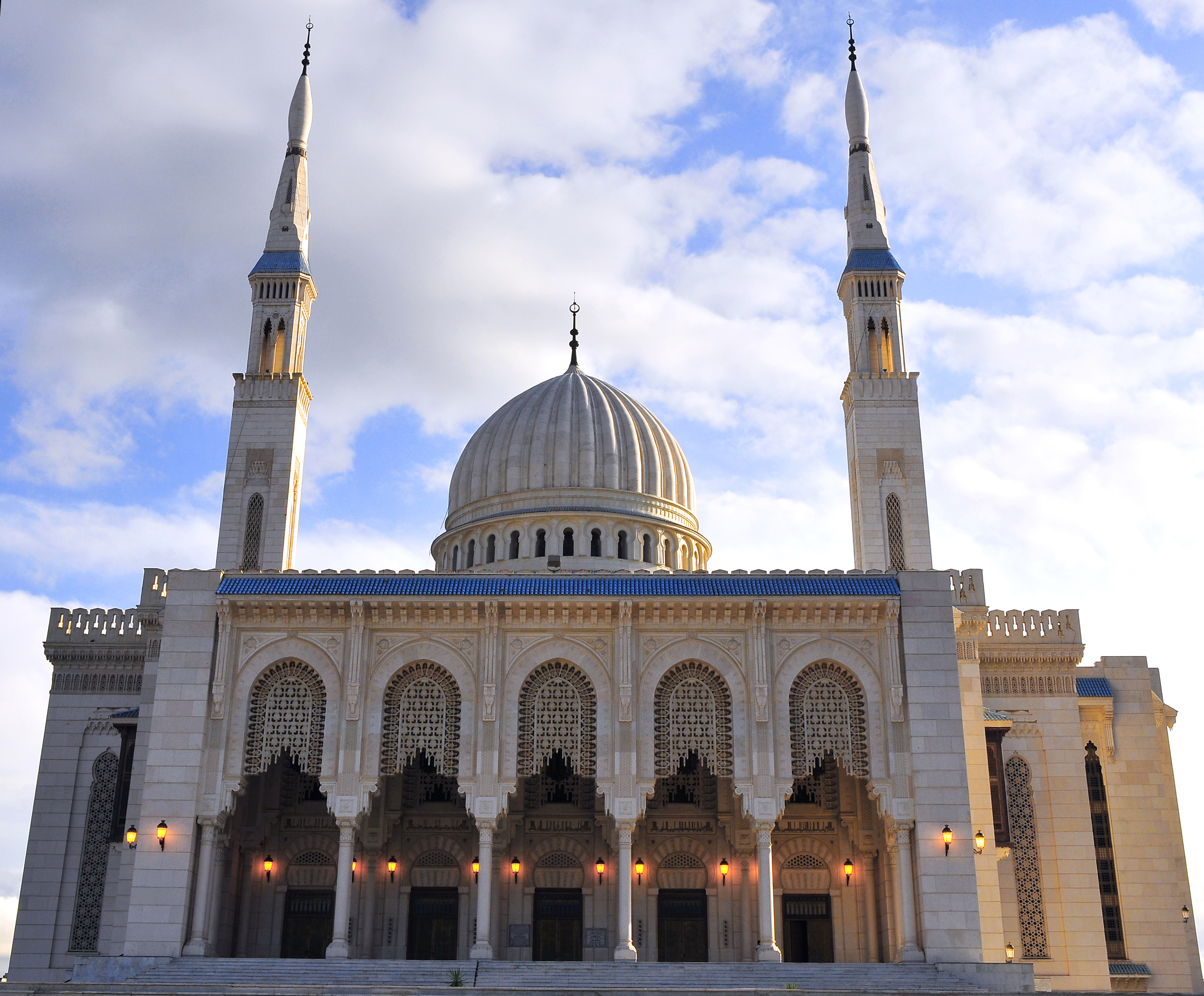
Emir Abdelkader Mosque in Constantine, by Moussa Mostafa Moussa (1968-1994)

=== 21st century ===
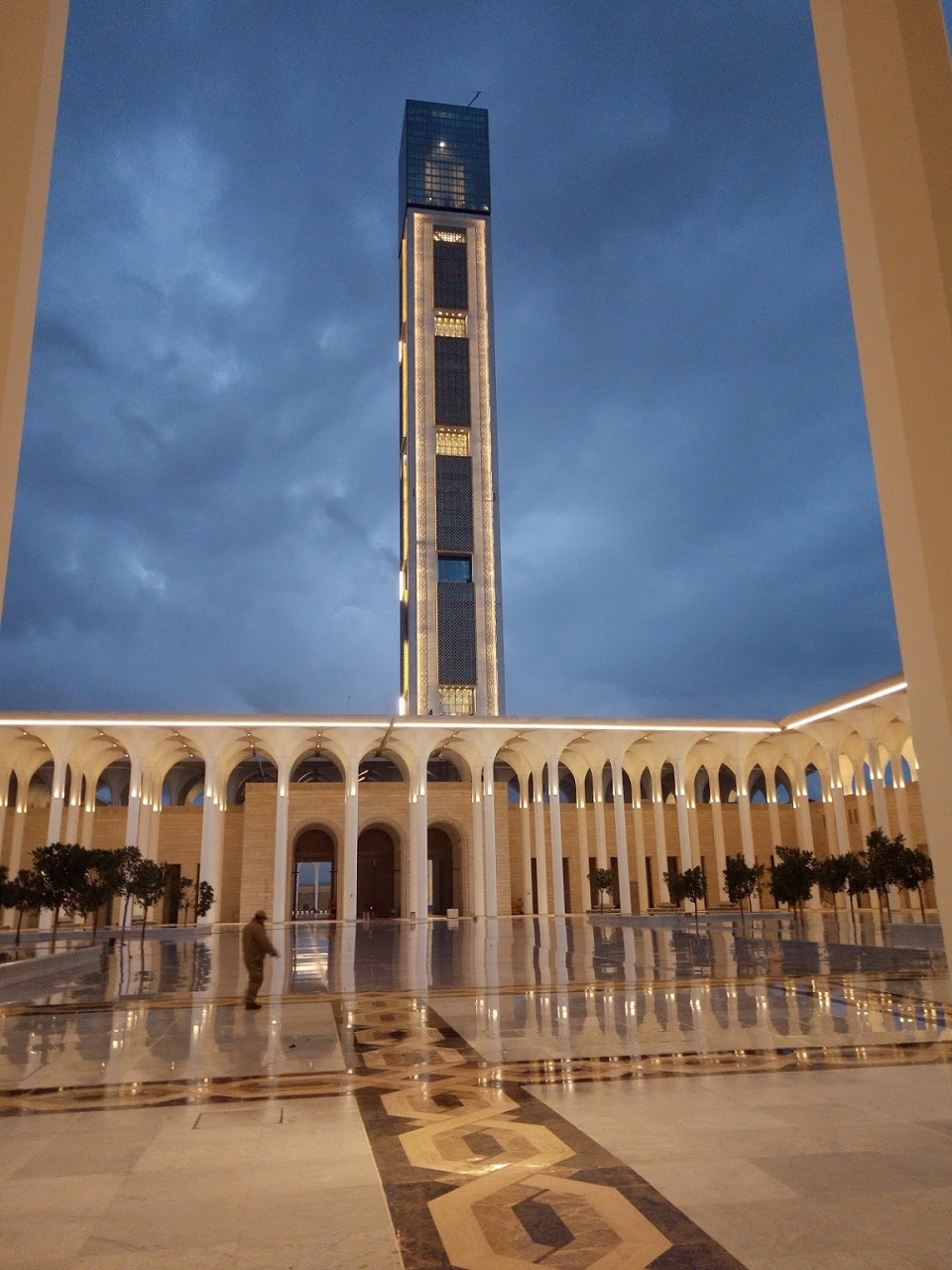
Djamaa el Djazaïr (KSP Jürgen Engel Architekten, 2012-2019)

== Berber architecture and other local forms ==
=== Northern Algeria ===
Northern Algerian Berbers traditionally utilize two types of vernacular dwelling: the Chaoui house and Kabyle akham. Shawia housing, traditional to the Chaoui Berbers of Aures, consists of flat-roofed mud brick houses with stone foundations. The ground floors of chaoui homes contain a central room used for sleeping with a hearth, weaving station, storage room, and water receptacles. These dwellings are sometimes built directly against other houses or rocks, in order to improve the efficiency of construction and reduce the costs of building materials.

Unlike chaoui dwellings, Kabyle homes, built by the Berbers of Kabylie, are constructed of stone and have pitched, tiled roofs. Kabyle houses are also built in sections; as the family expands additional sections can be added. The ground floor of a typical kabyle dwelling is divided into two sections, the first, darker section, is used to house animals while the other, illuminated end, is used for cooking, weaving, and receiving guests. A small attic above the livestock quarters is traditionally used as a bedroom during the winter.

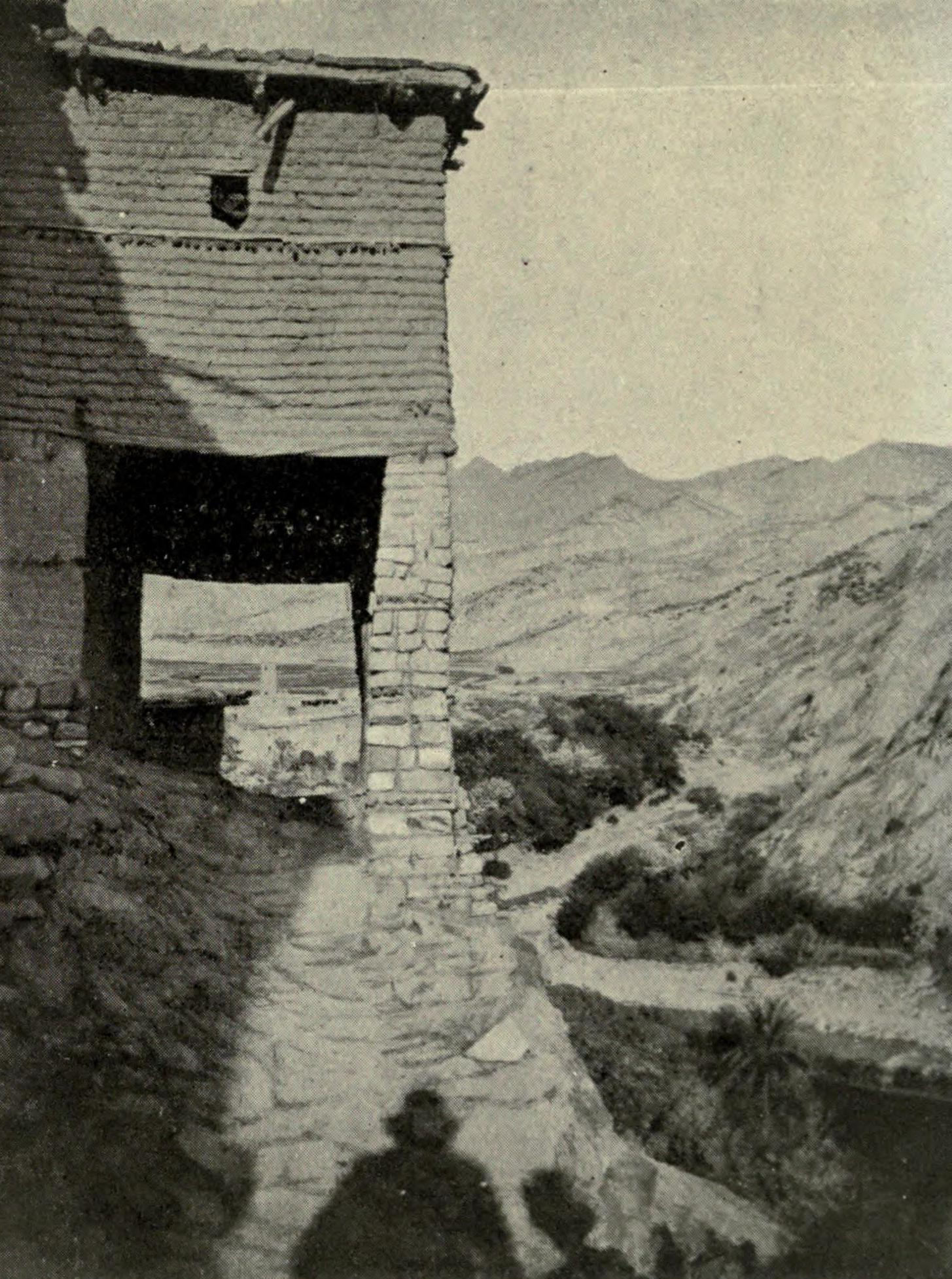
Chaoui house in Menaâ (circa 1920)

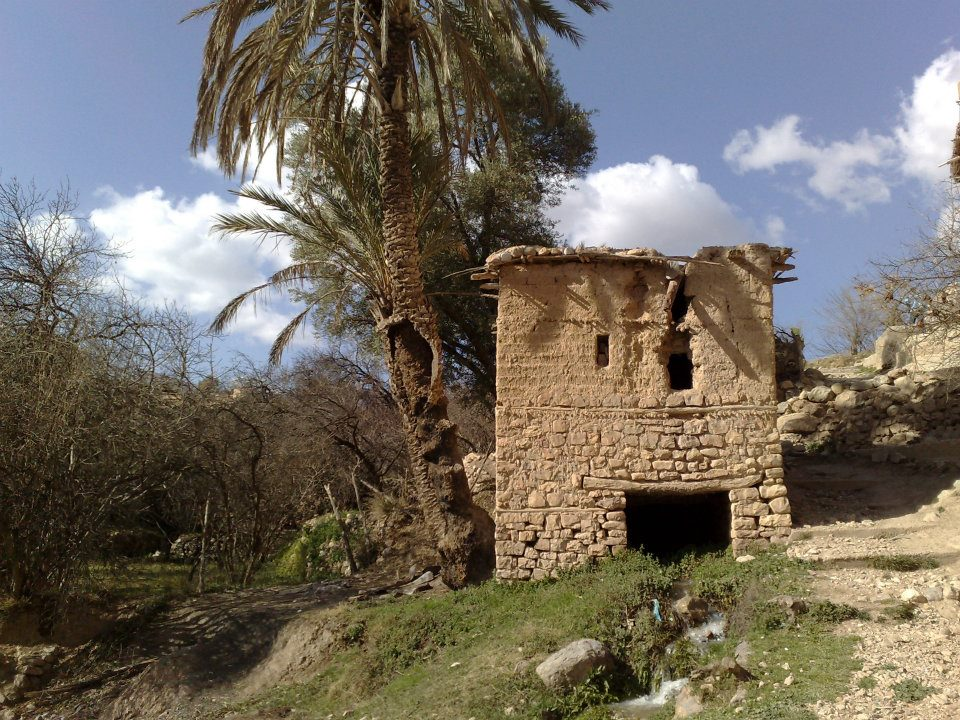
Chaoui building in Menaâ with stone foundation and brick walls visible

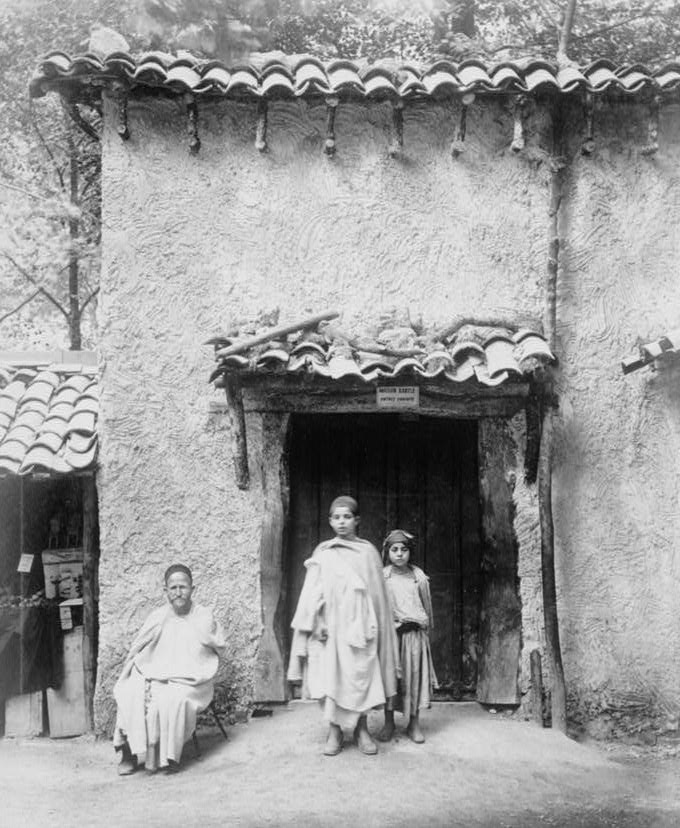
Image of Kabyle akham presented at the Exposition Universelle of 1889

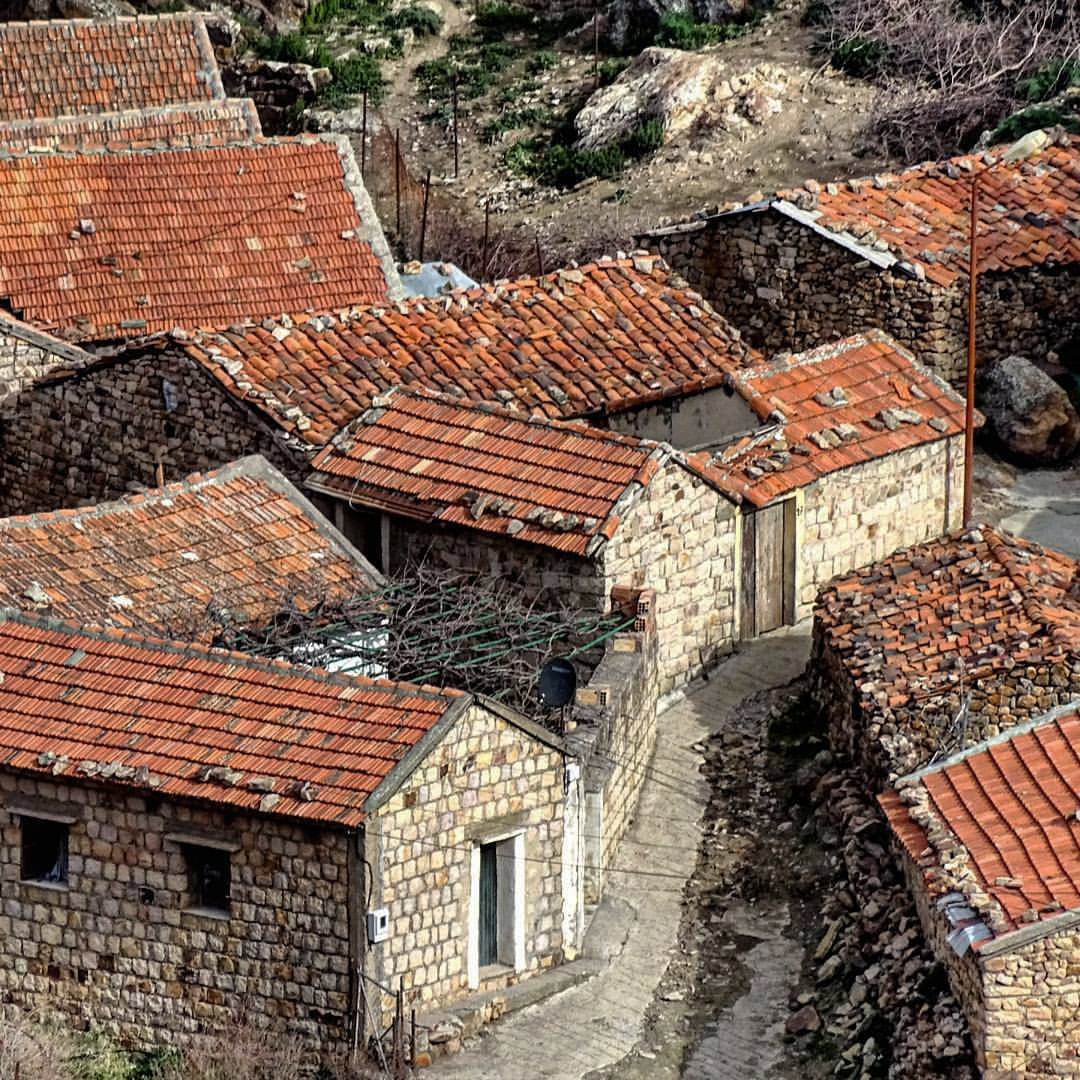
Old Kabyle houses in Bejaia Province

=== M'zab ===
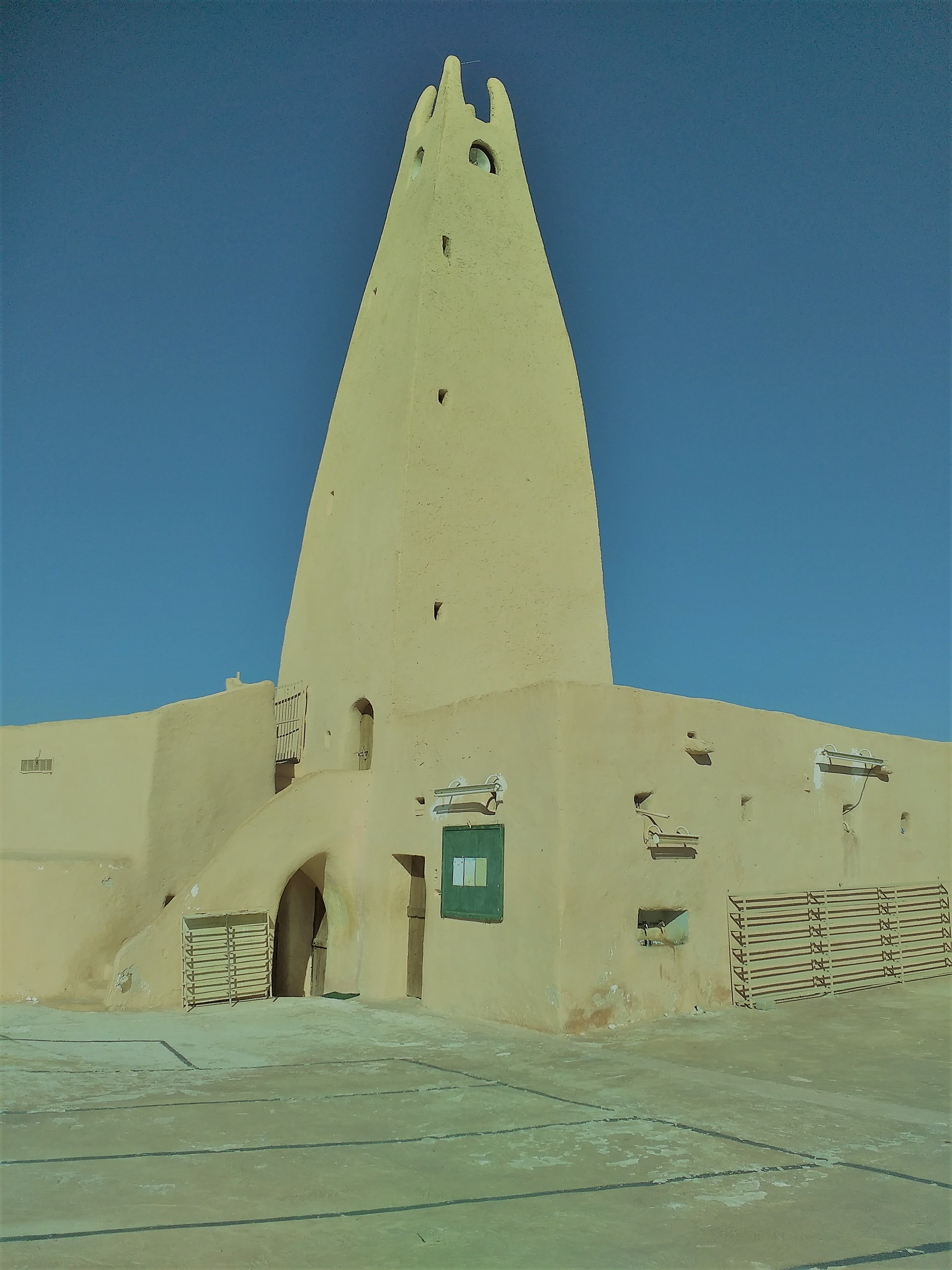
The central mosque in Ghardaïa, an example of local architecture in the M'zab region

The M'zab region of Algeria, which includes the city of Ghardaïa, has distinctive mosques and houses that are built using rammed earth and completely whitewashed. The structures here also make frequent use of domes and barrel vaults. The mosque minarets in this region are distinctive from those of other regions: they are tall and have a square base, but they taper towards the summit and are crowned with "horn"-like corners. The houses are typically entered via a bent or winding passage that leads to a central courtyard on the ground floor, with a gallery typically surrounding this space on the upper floor. Sections of the house sometimes overhang above the street and are supported by stone corbels.
