= Palais des Rais =

- قصر الرياس
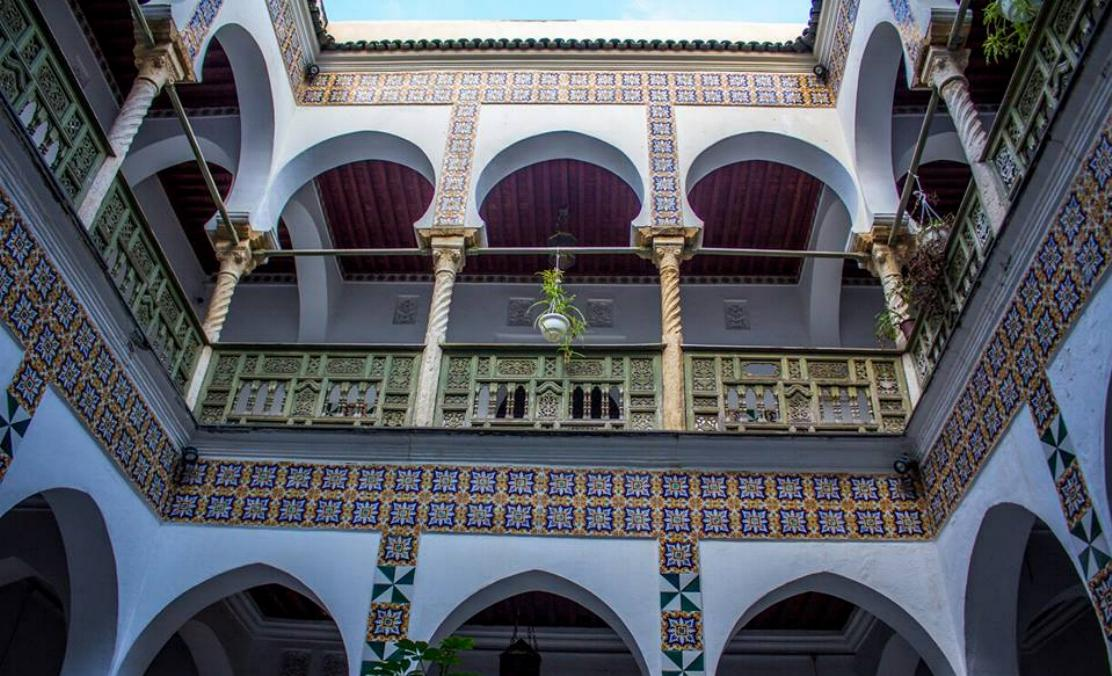

- Location within Algiers
- Interactive map of the Palais des Rais area

General information
- Architectural style: Moorish, Algerian
- Location: Algiers, Algeria
- Coordinates: 36°47′18″N 3°03′51″E

UNESCO World Heritage Site
- Part of: Casbah of Algiers
- Criteria: Cultural: (ii), (v)
- Reference: 565
- Inscription: 1992 (16th Session)

The Palais des Rais (Arabic: قصر الرياس), also known as Bastion 23, is a classified historical monument located in Algiers, Algeria. It is notable for its architecture and for being the last surviving quarter (houma) of the lower Casbah of Algiers, a UNESCO World Heritage Site.

Consisting of three palaces and six houses, whose history began with the construction of Bordj-Ez-zoubia in 1576 by the Dey Ramdhan Pasha in order to reinforce the means of defence of this side of the Medina, this quarter ended up being detached, and even isolated from its traditional environment following the restructuring of the lower Casbah during the French period.

It was not until 1909 that Bastion 23 was classified as a Historical Monument under the name Group of Moorish houses. The site was classified as a UNESCO World Heritage Site in 1992.

== History ==
The history of the Palais des Rais dates back to 1576, when Dey Ramdhan Pasha constructed Borj El-Rais (Tower of the Rais) to strengthen the defenses of the lower city. Over time, the site earned several names, including Qaa El-Sour, Sabaa El-Tabran, and Toubanet Arnaout, reflecting its defensive purpose and the artillery brought by Rais Yahia.

During the French colonial era, the structure was renamed Fort 23 following the construction of the city's defensive walls. The numbering of the palace (e.g., Palace 16, Palace 17) and the adjacent "Fishermen's Houses" was introduced during the surveying efforts of the same period.

The sole historical reference available pertains to Palace 18, which was built by Rais Mami Arnaout around 1750.

== Colonial period ==
After 1830, the year of Algiers' occupation, Palace 18 underwent several changes in function. It initially served as the residence of the Commander of Civil Engineering. Subsequently, it became a boarding school for girls, followed by its use as the United States Consulate Office. Later, it was repurposed as the residence of the "Duke of Aumale" and finally transformed into the municipal library.

== After independence ==
After Algeria's independence in 1962, Algerian families occupied the historic site, leading to certain alterations. While this occupation caused some damage to the structure, it also contributed to preserving specific wooden artifacts in relatively good condition. However, the building suffered from exposure to climatic factors and its proximity to the sea, resulting in harmful effects that eventually posed a risk of collapse.

In 1980, the Ministry of Culture initiated a phased intervention to safeguard the historic landmark. The first step involved relocating residents to alternative housing, followed by conducting studies and restoration efforts. These measures aimed to transform the site into what would later become the Center for Arts and Culture at the Palais des Rais (Fort 23). The primary goal of the restoration project was to rehabilitate and adapt the structure for optimal use. Restoration work continued from 1987 to 1993, and the palace was officially opened to the public in 1994.

== Timeline of Key Events for the Palais des Rais ==
- 1750–1798: Dey Mustafa constructs Palace No. 18.
- 1830: The French occupation of Algiers begins.
- 1840: Start of urban transformations in the Casbah of Algiers.
- 1906: Fort 23 is classified as a national heritage site (reaffirmed by Decree 67-281 on December 20, 1967).
- 1932: Launch of a development program for the Casbah; gradual disappearance of maritime neighborhoods, replaced by the European city.
- 1962: Fort 23, the only remaining evidence of the Casbah’s extension toward the sea, becomes a residence for Algerian families.
- Early 1980s: Families relocated, and the Ministry of Culture takes charge of the site.
- 1980–1985: Technical oversight by COMEDOR; visits by UNESCO experts and consultants.
- 1985–1986: Structural studies conducted by a Turkish engineering firm.
- Late 1987: Restoration work begins, led by an Italian company.
- 1991: The site is reclassified as a national heritage monument.
- 1992: The site is listed as a UNESCO World Heritage site (as part of the Casbah classification).
- November 1, 1994: Official opening of the Center for Arts and Culture at the Palais des Rais.

== Location ==
Palais des Rais is located in the northeastern part of the Casbah municipality, at the intersection of "November 1, 1954 Street" and "Mohamed Rachid Amara Street."

== Gallery ==
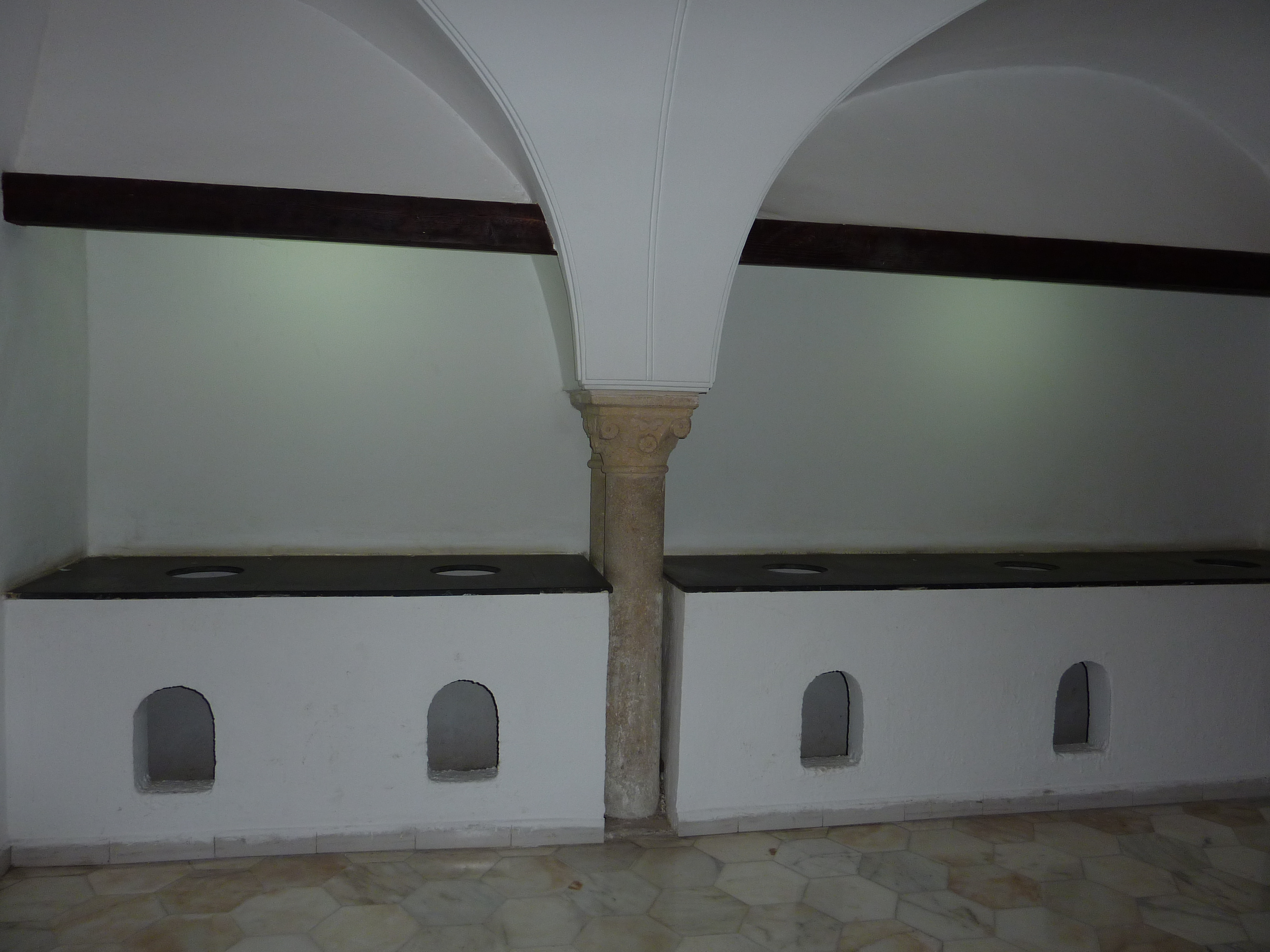
Palais des Rais (Al Khayyama)

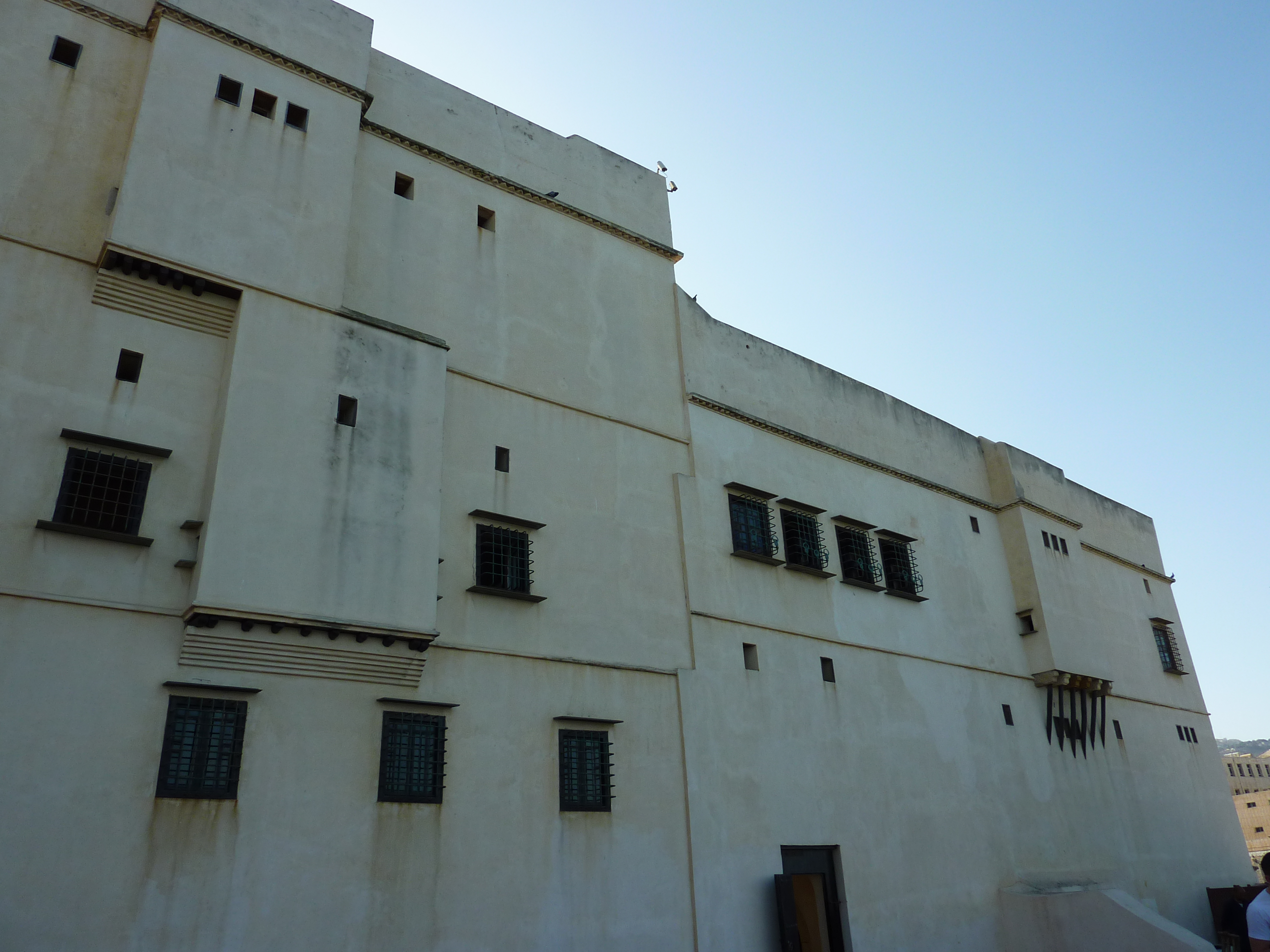
Outside the Palais des Rais

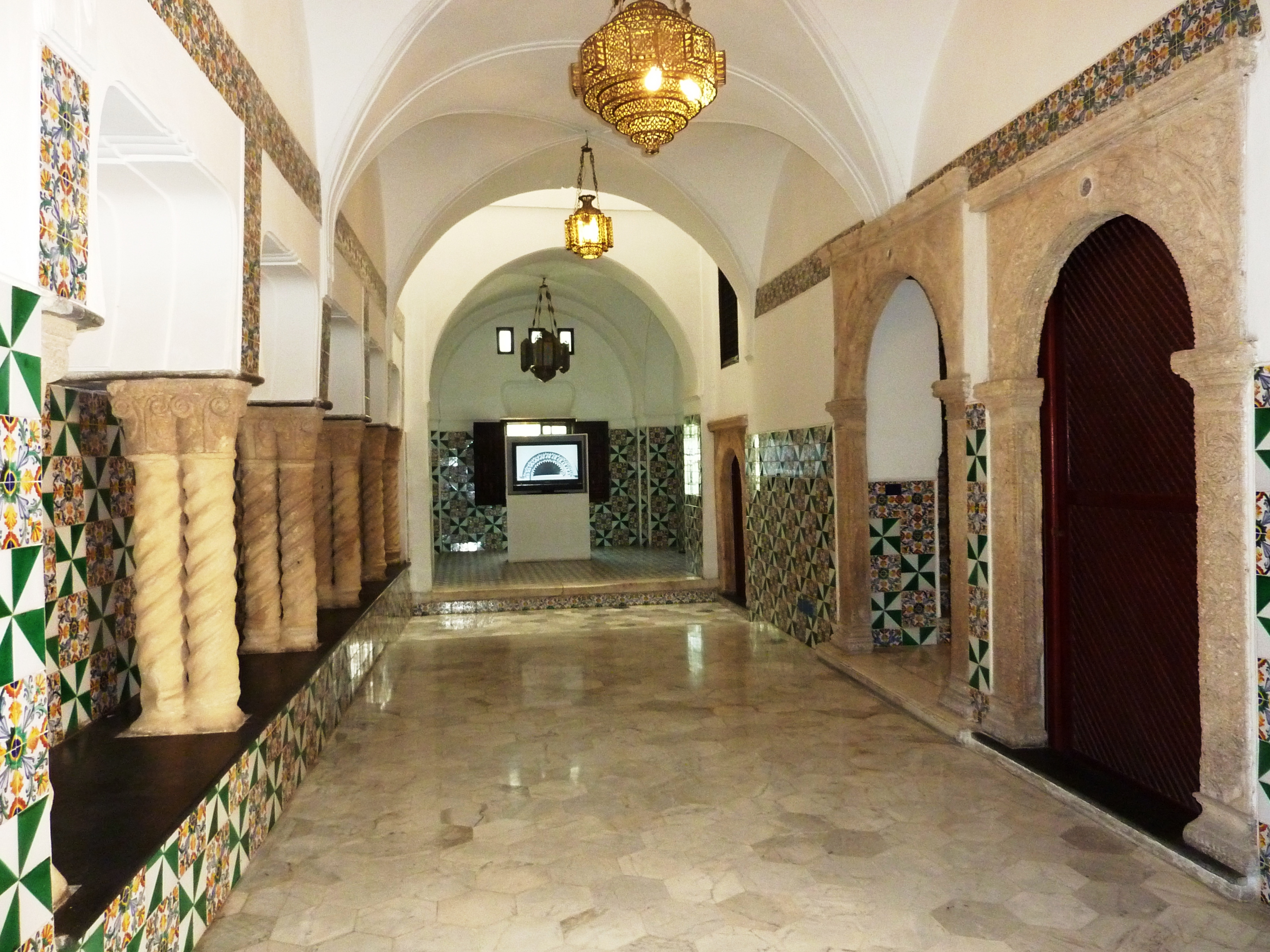
Palais des Rais (The Shed)

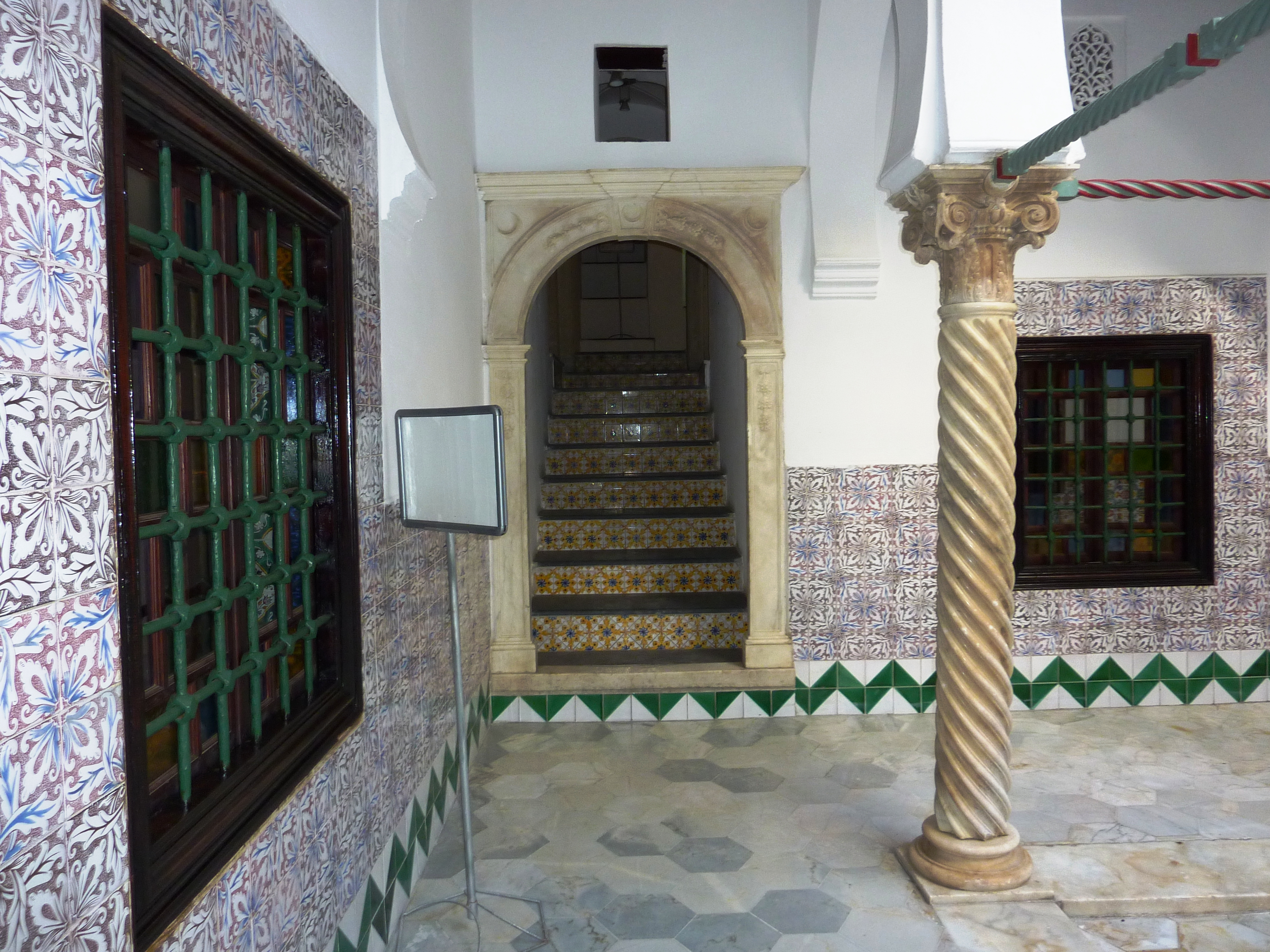
Palais des Rais (Wedge)

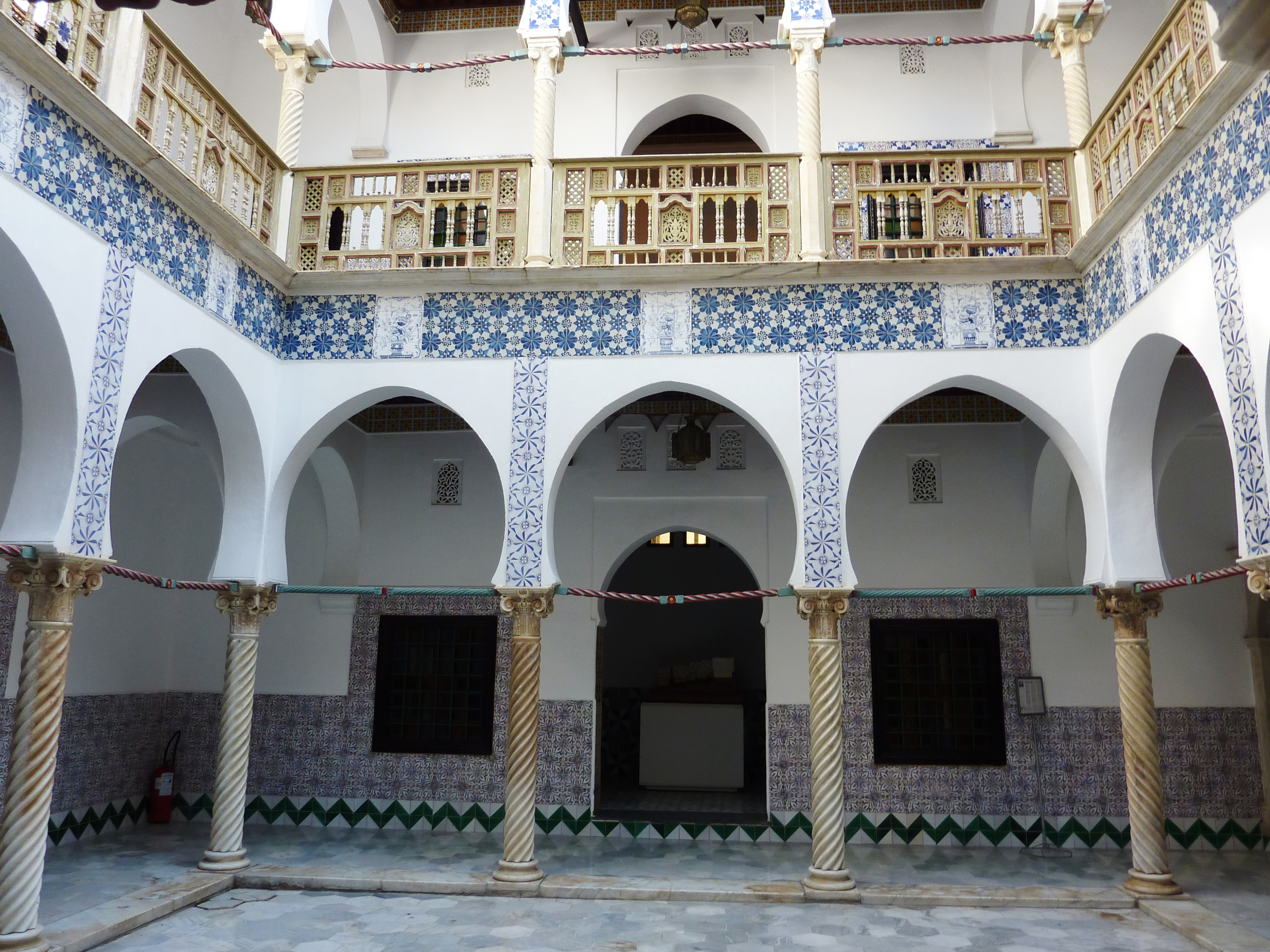
Palais des Rais (Al-Sahin)

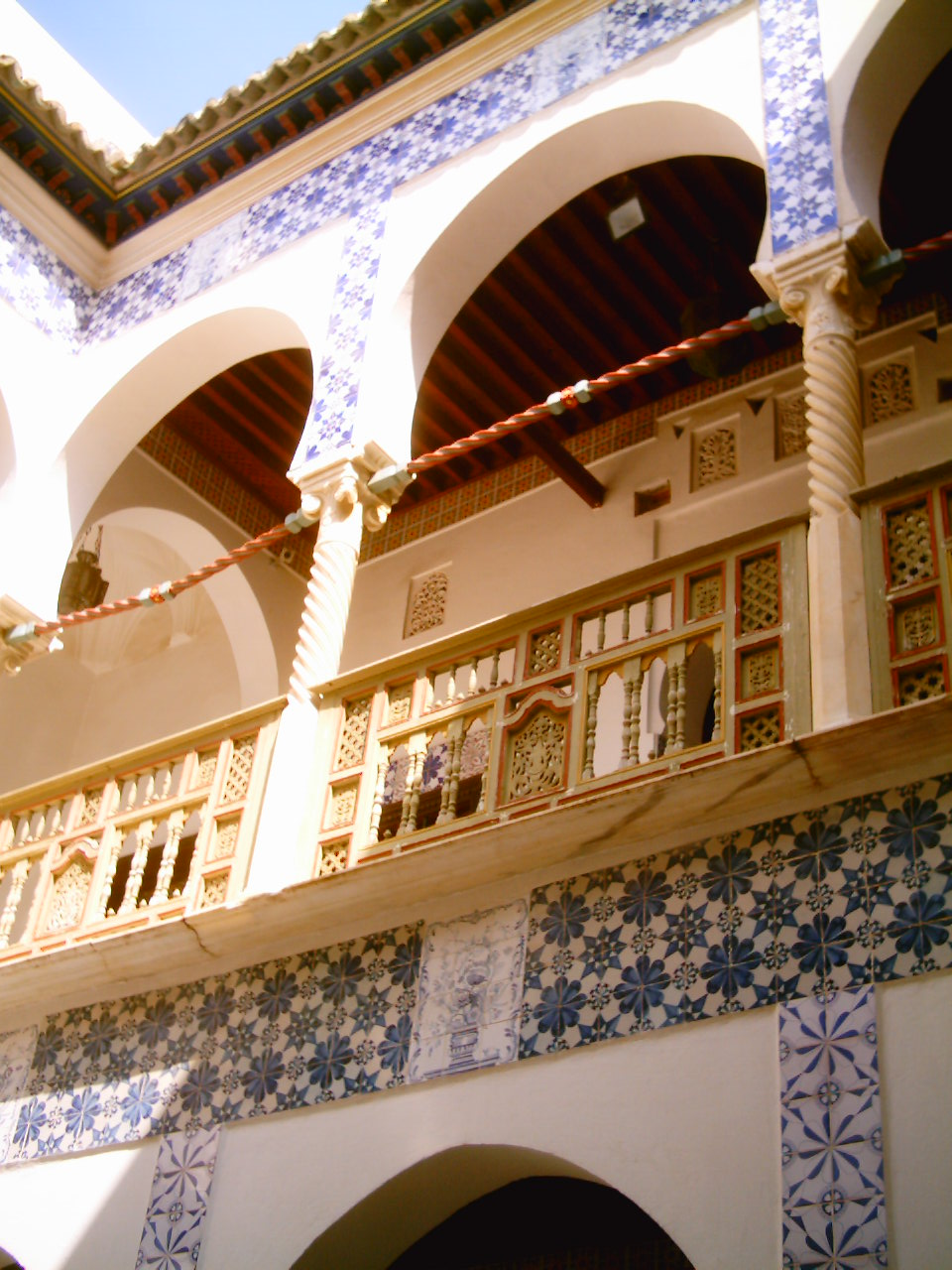
Palais des Rais

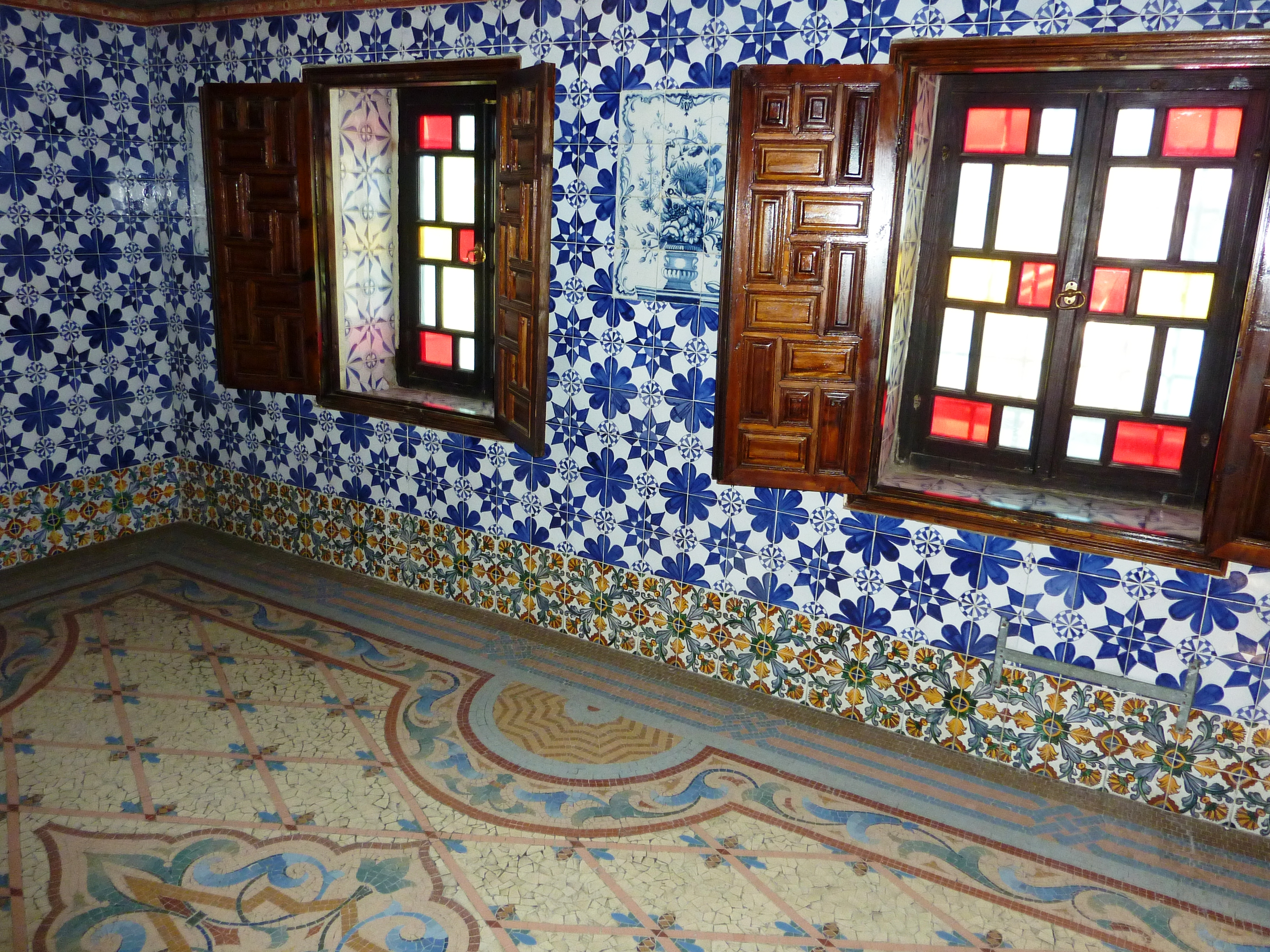
Palais des Rais (decorative floor)

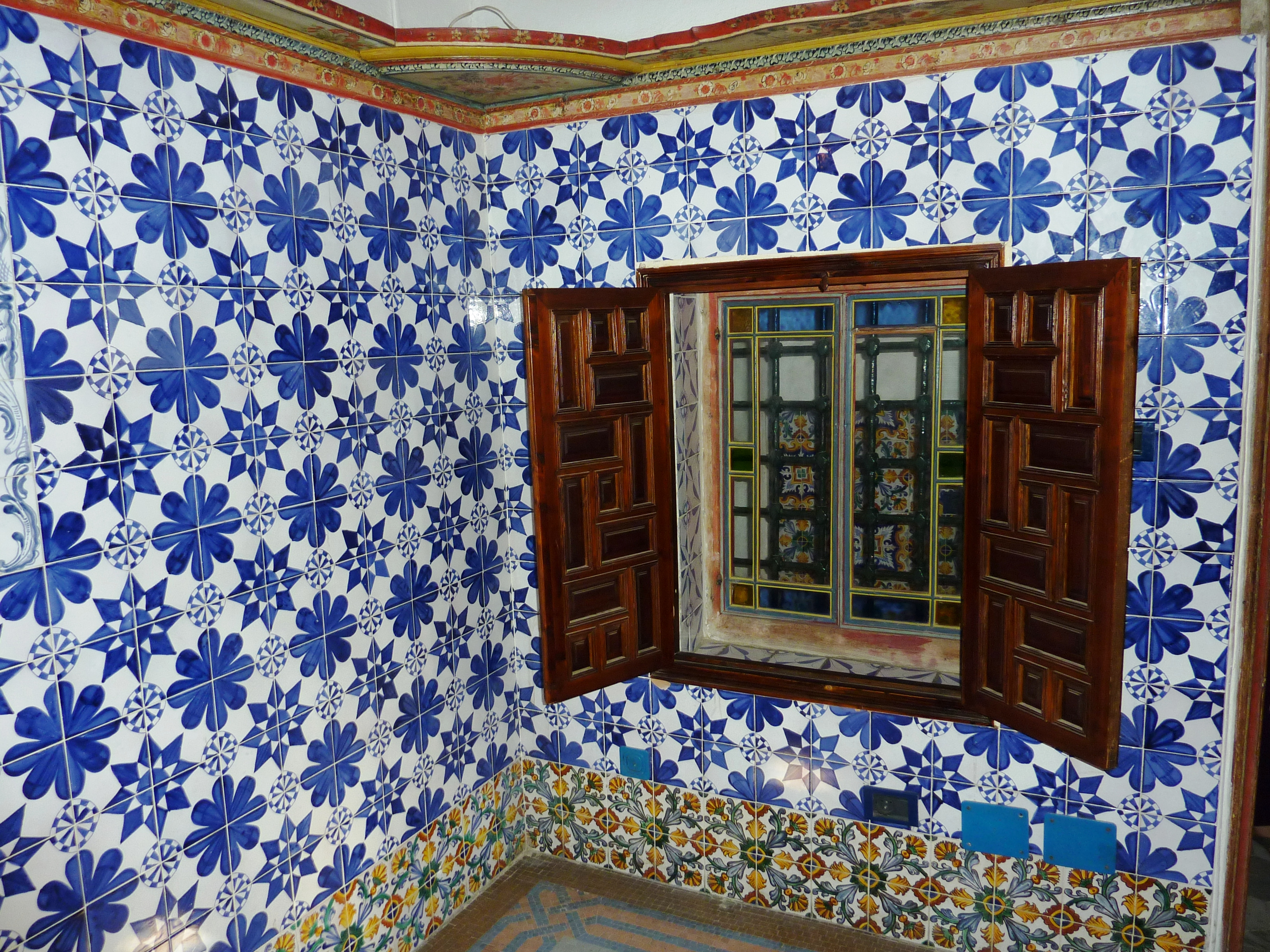
Palais des Rais (room window)

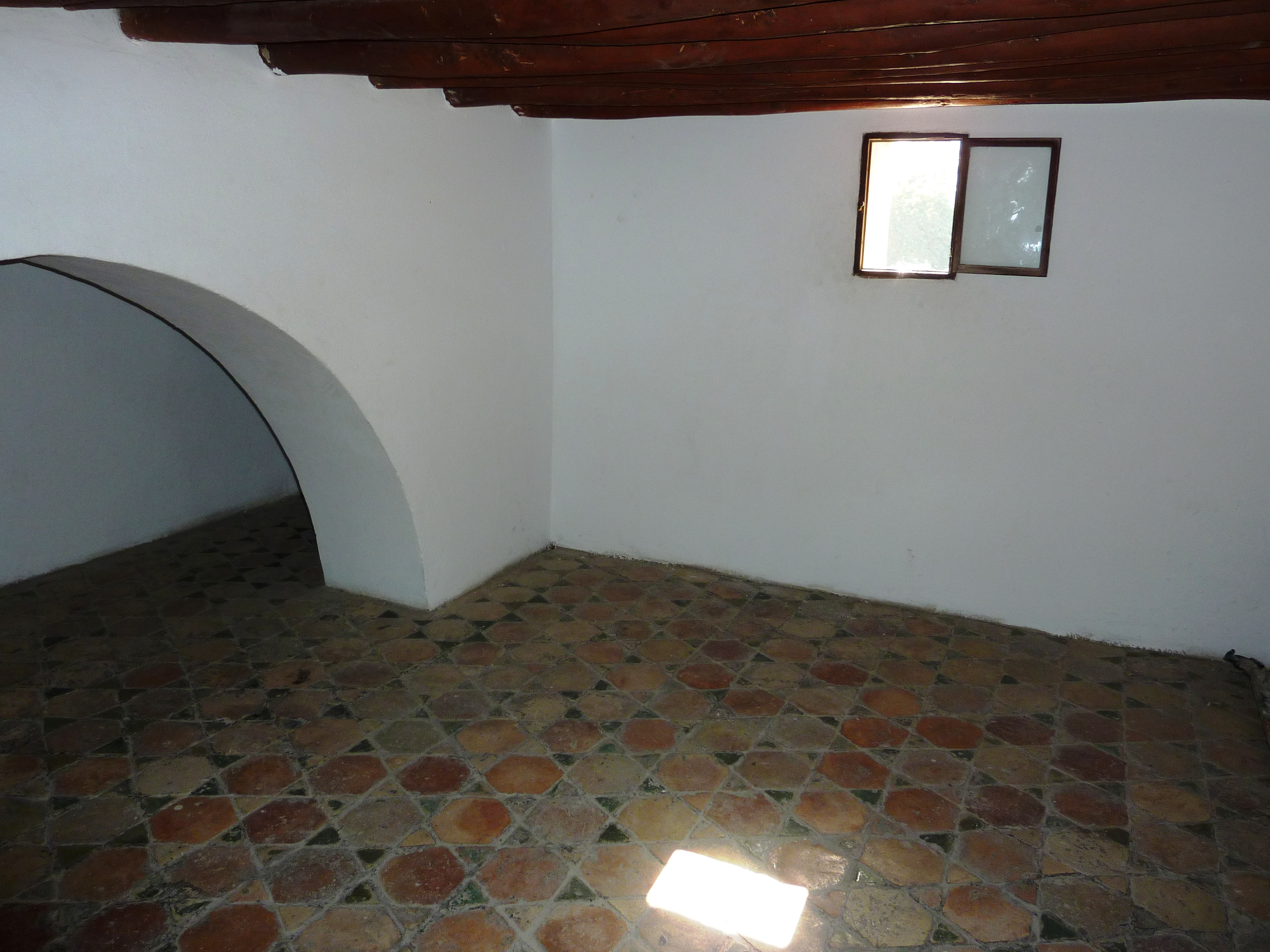
Inside the Palais des Rais

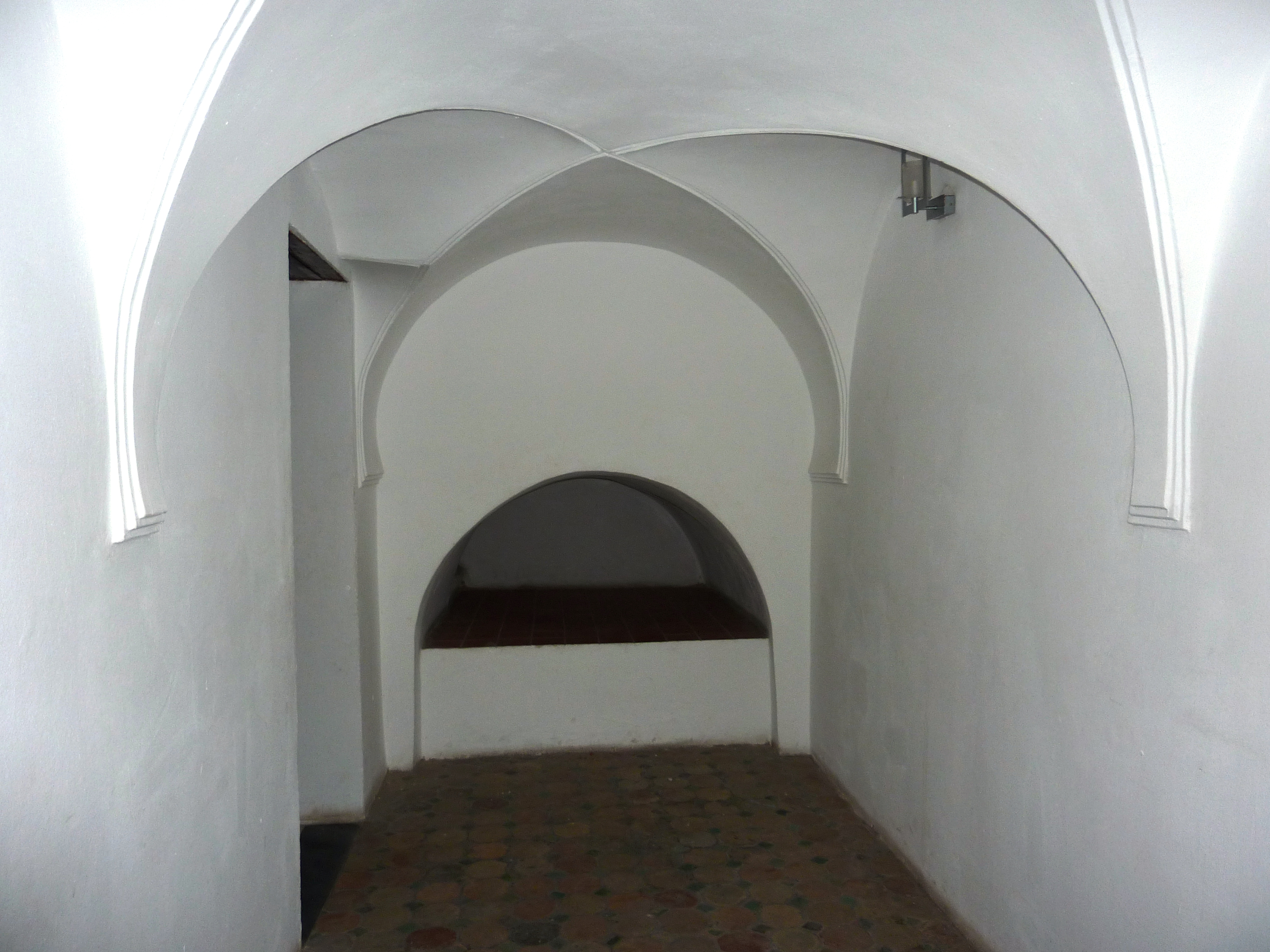
Inside the Palais des Rais

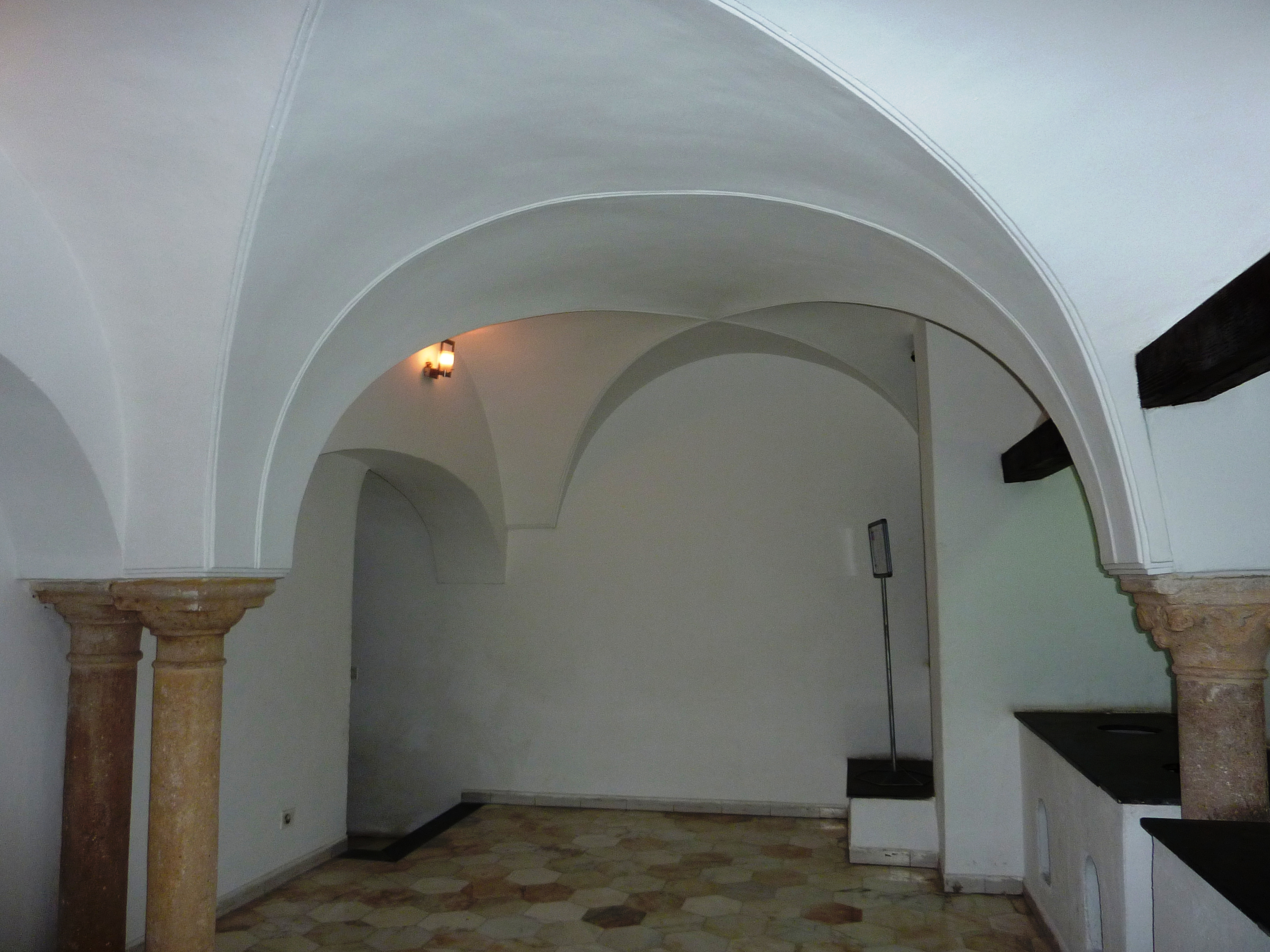
Palais des Rais (tent, kitchen)

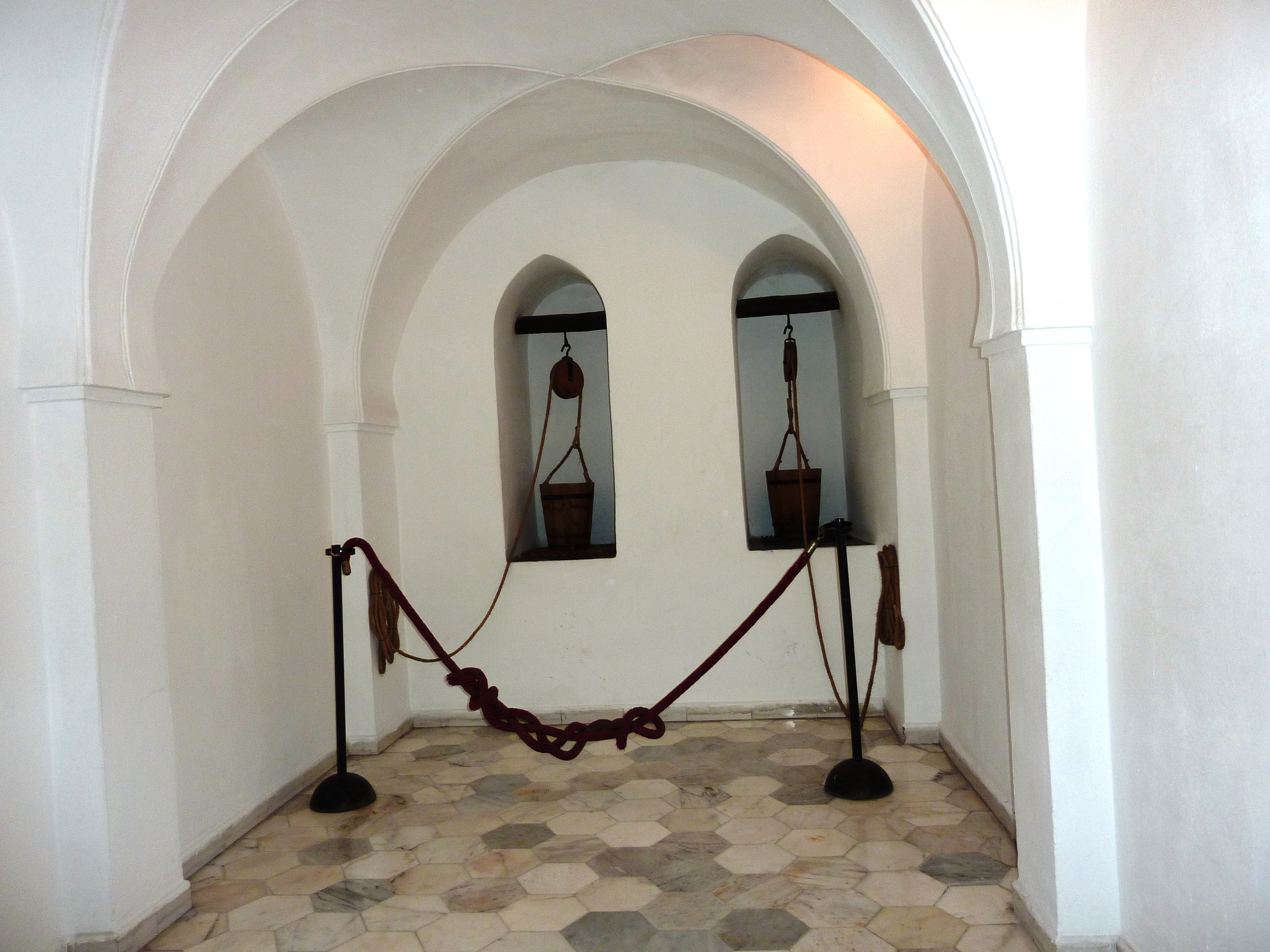
Palais des Rais (Water House)

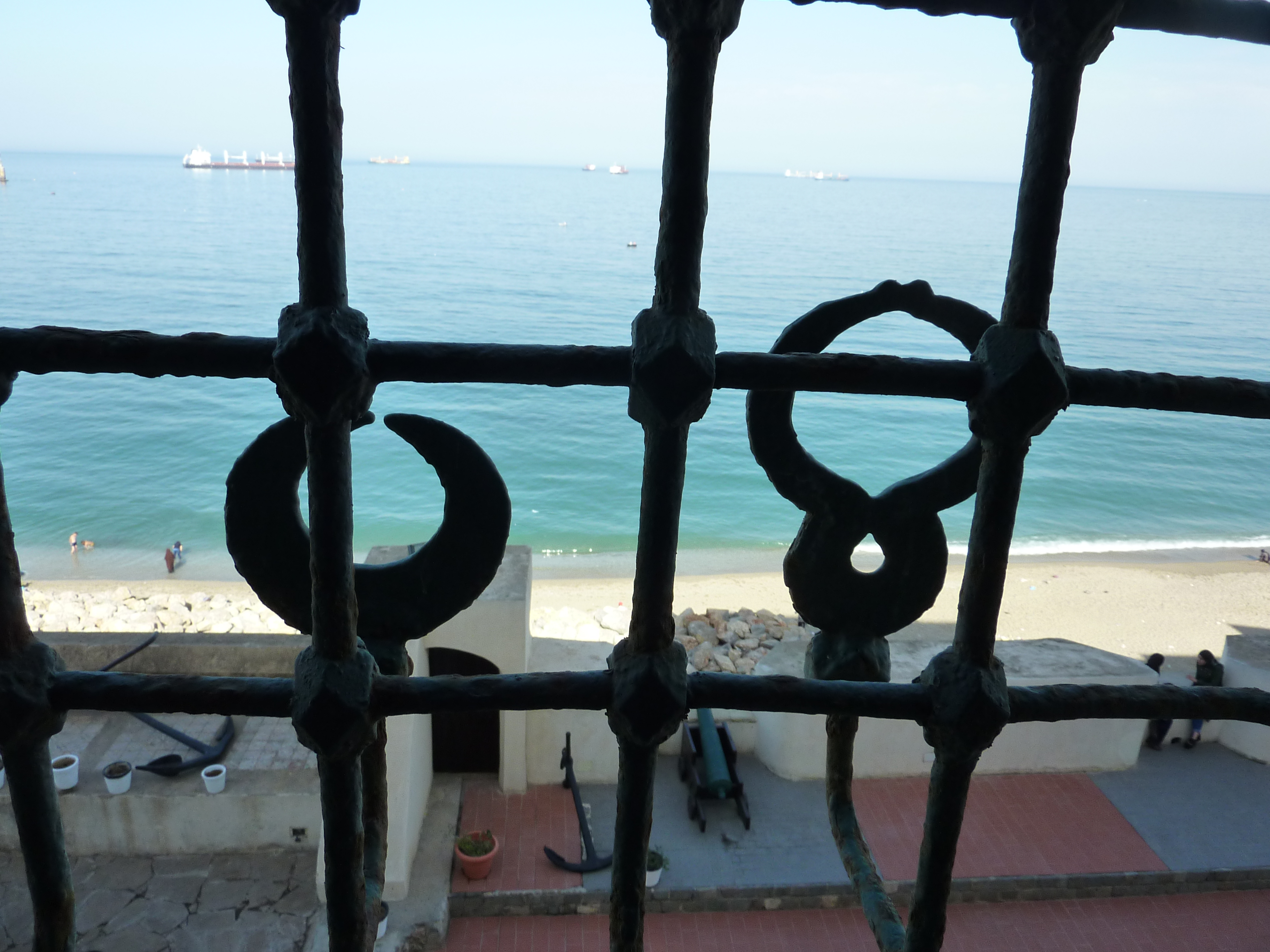
A l'interieur du palais des Rais ou Bastion 23 (vue sur mer).

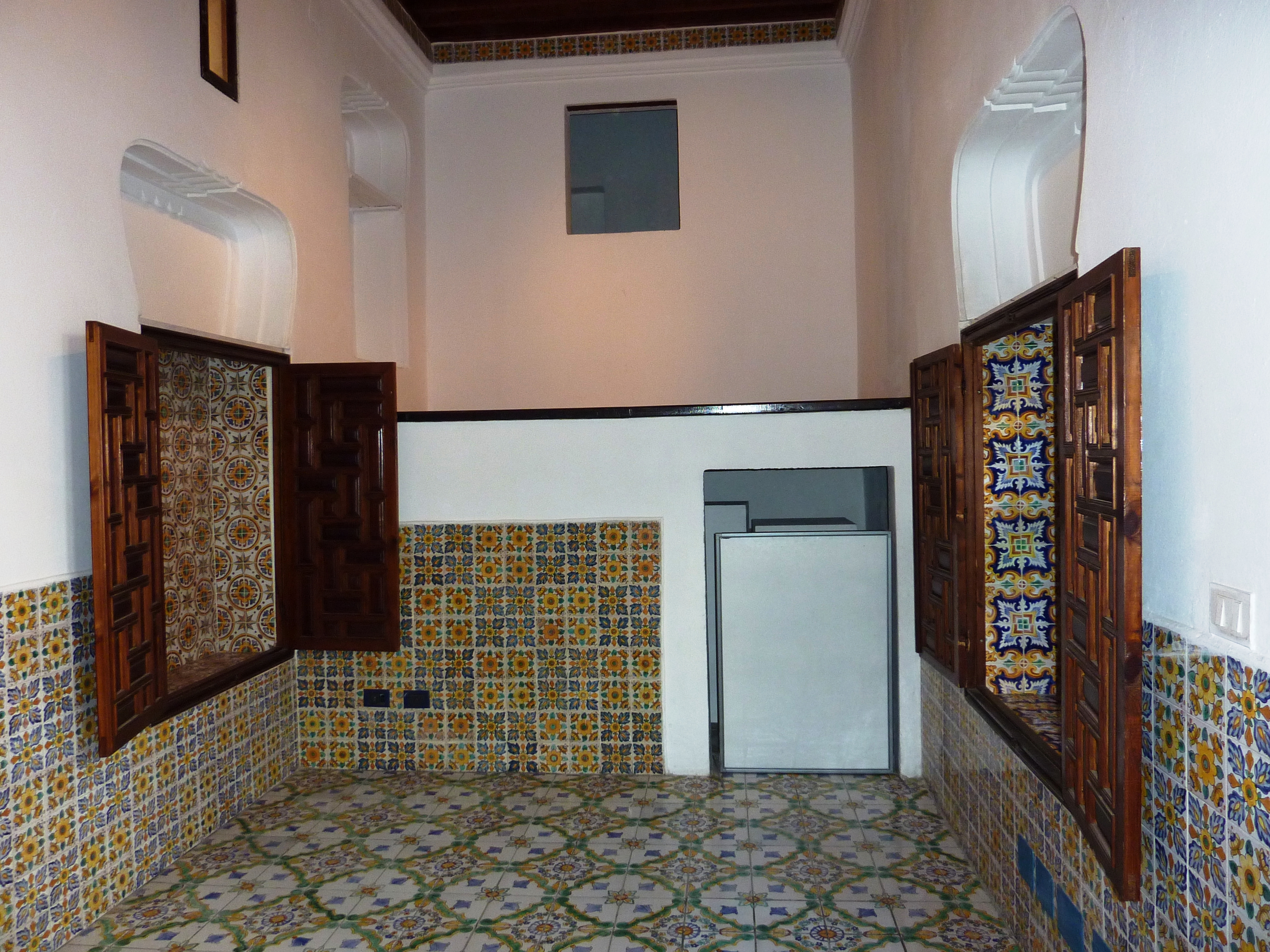

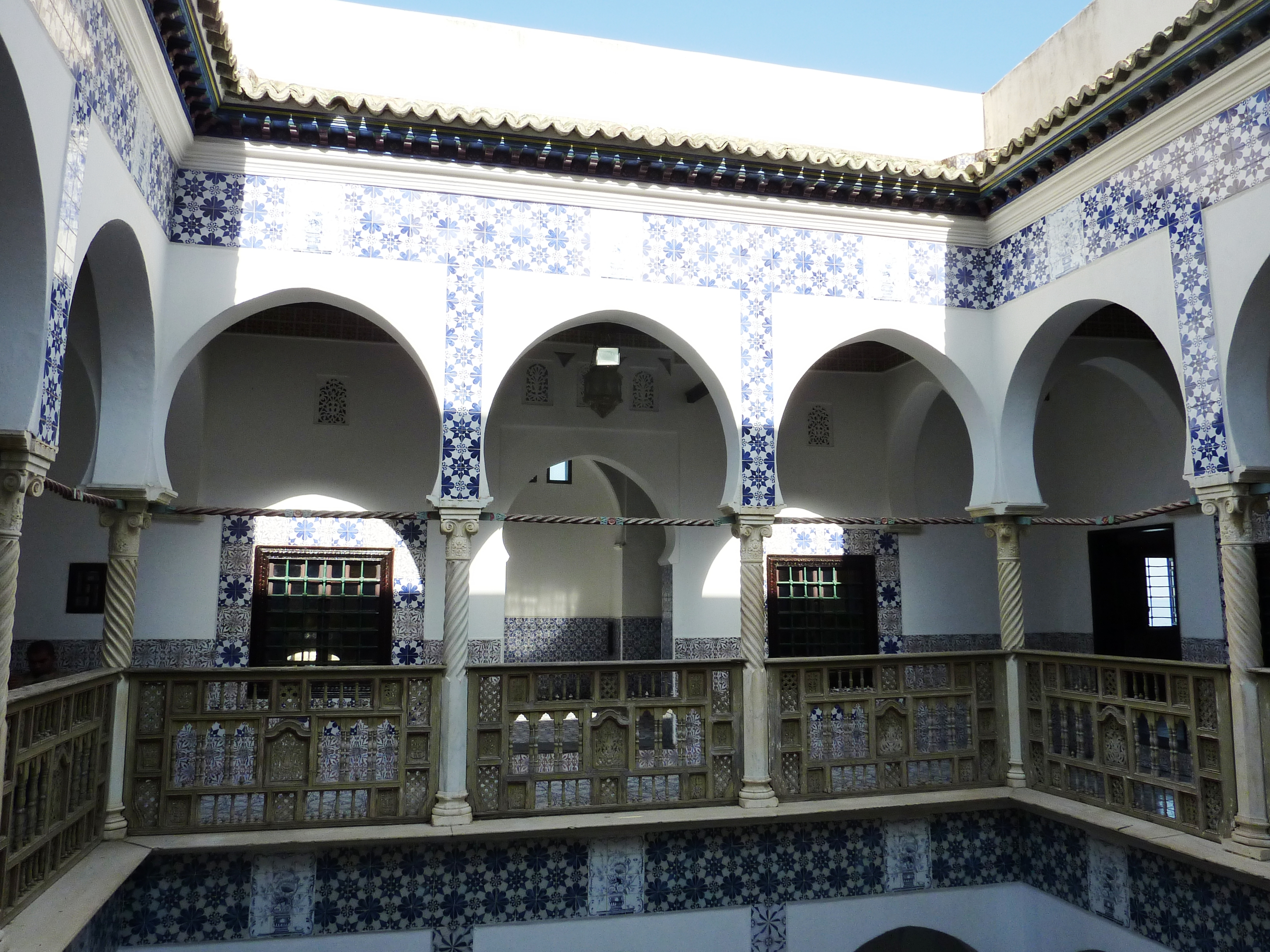

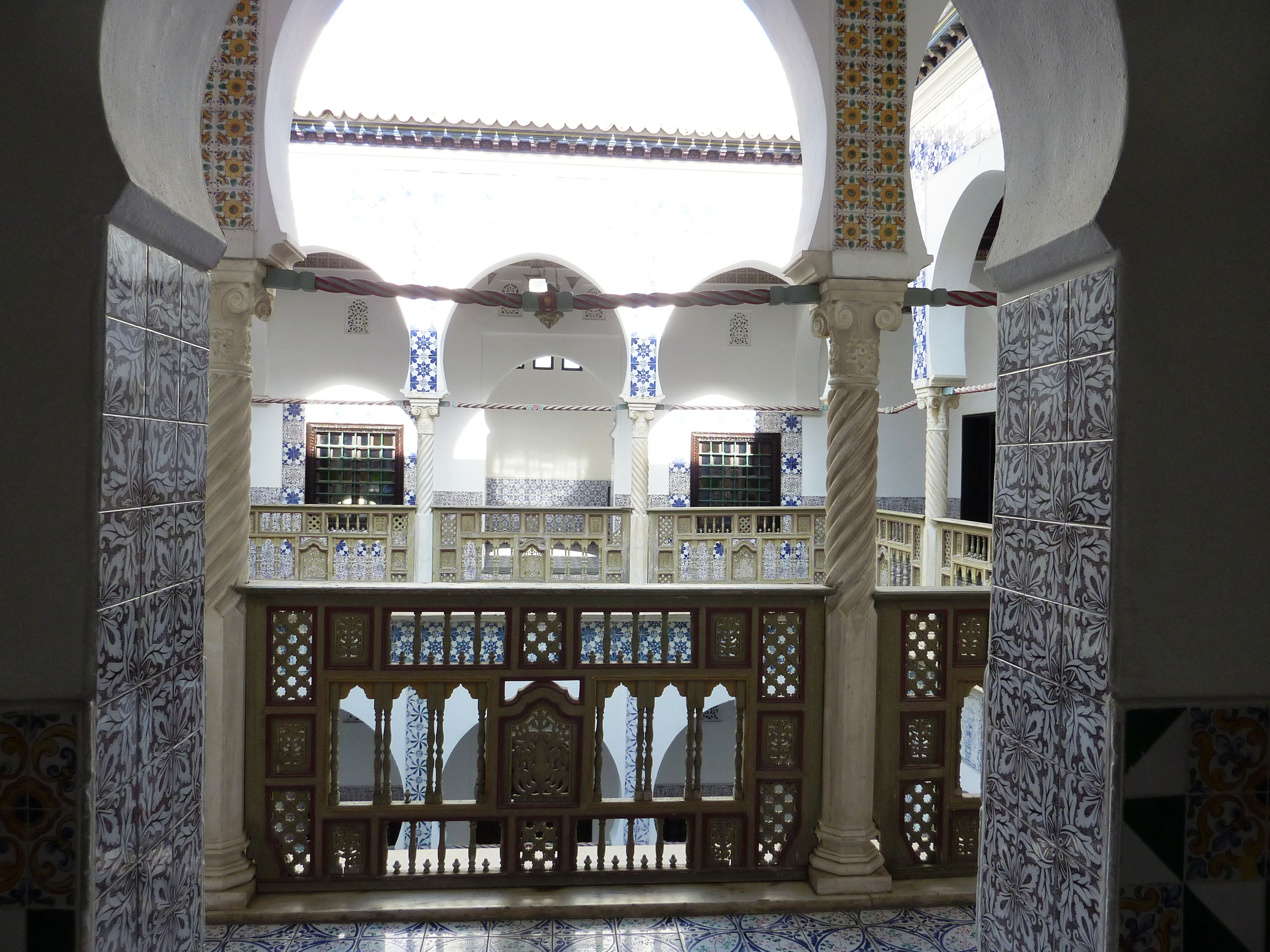
Inside the Palais des Rais

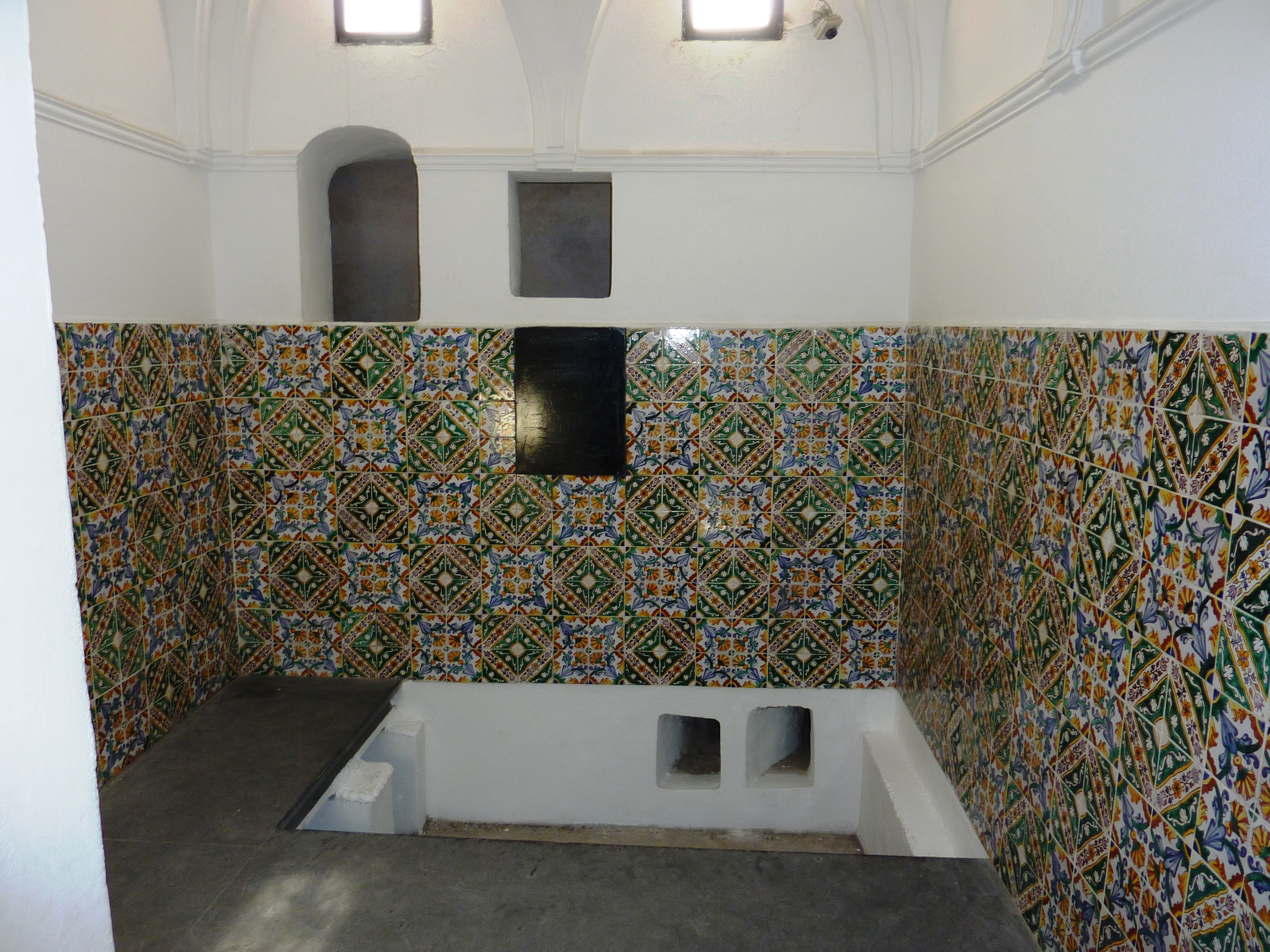
Palais des Rais (Hammam)

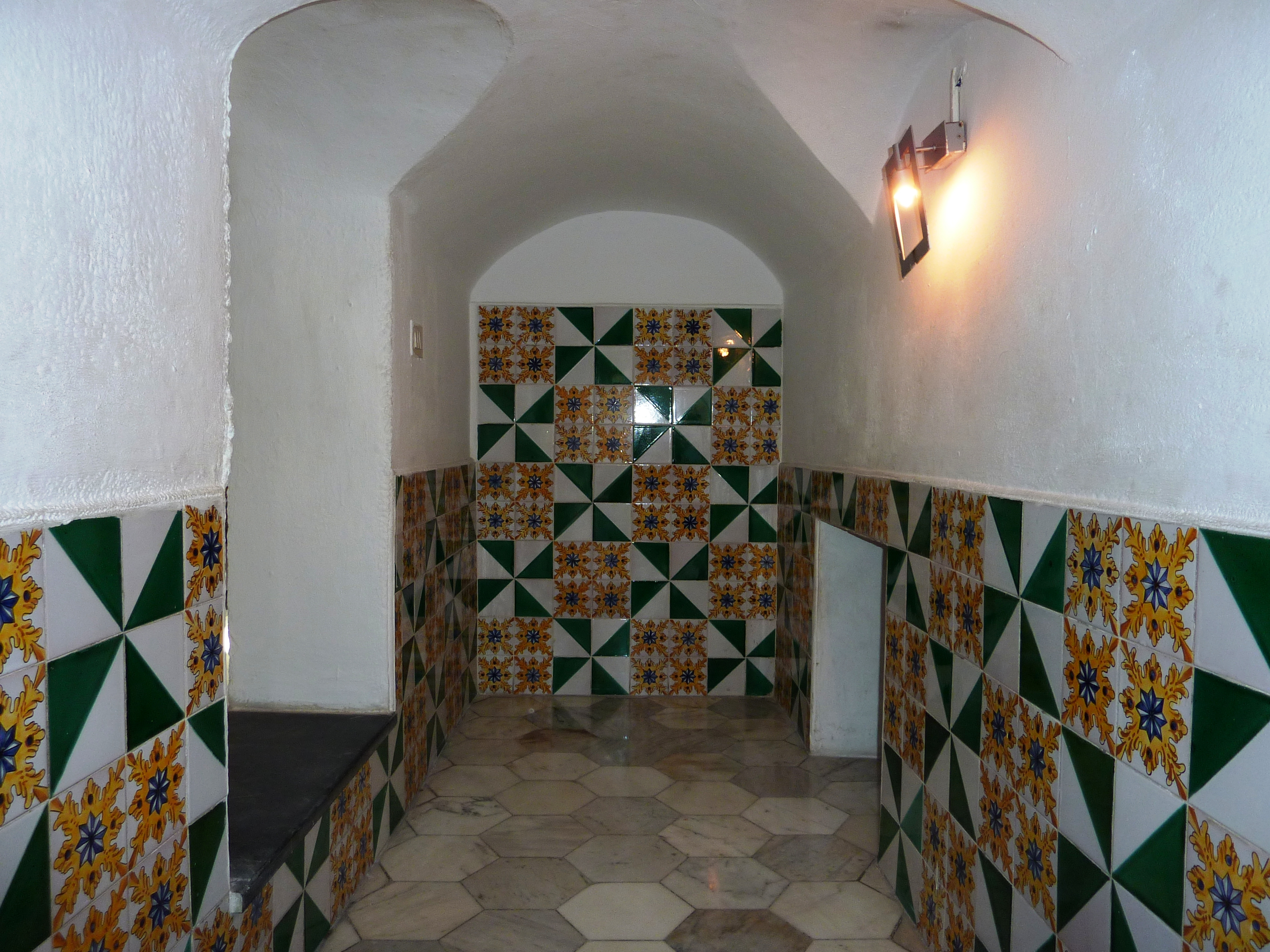
Palais des Rais (Hammam entrance)

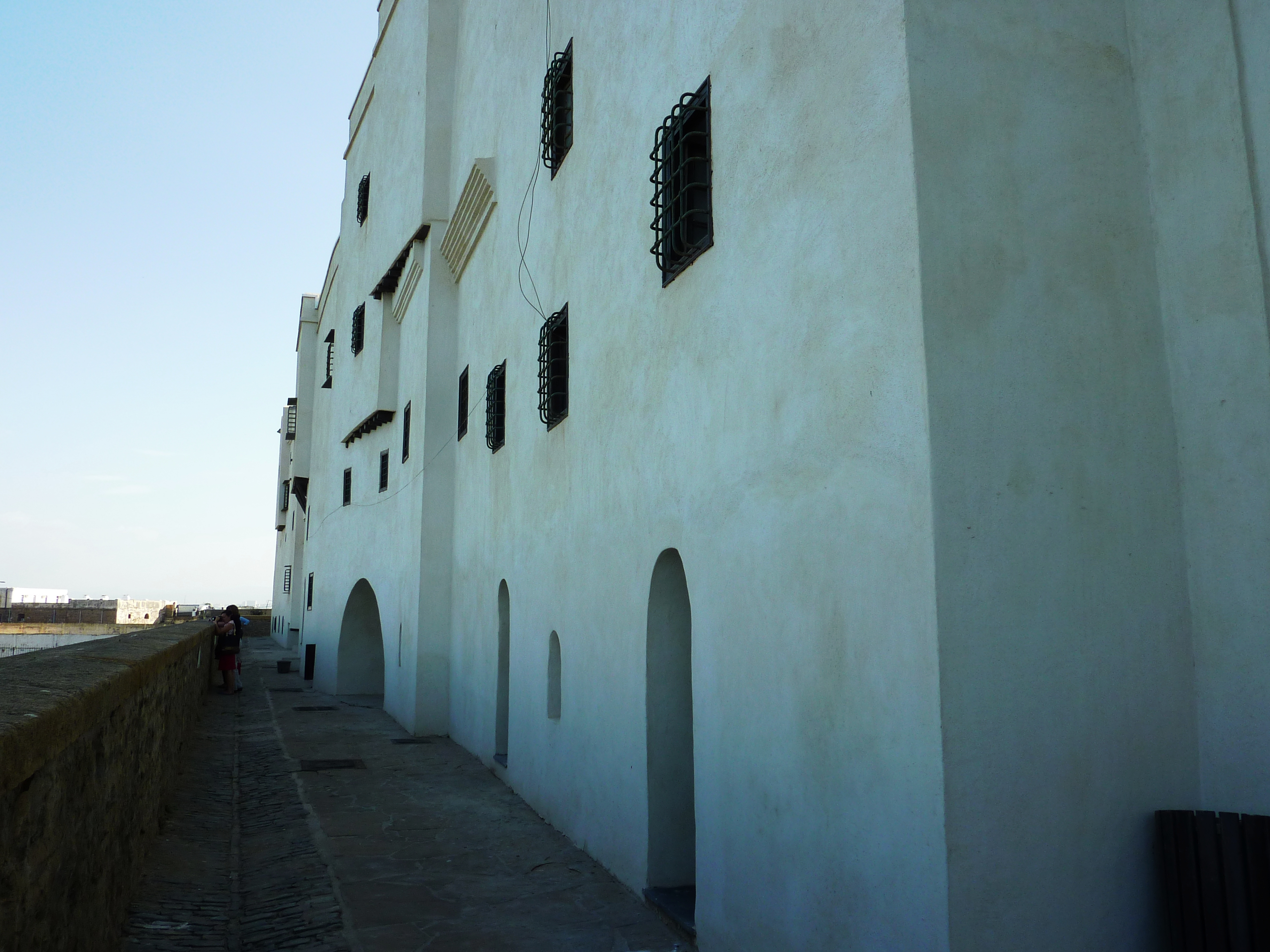

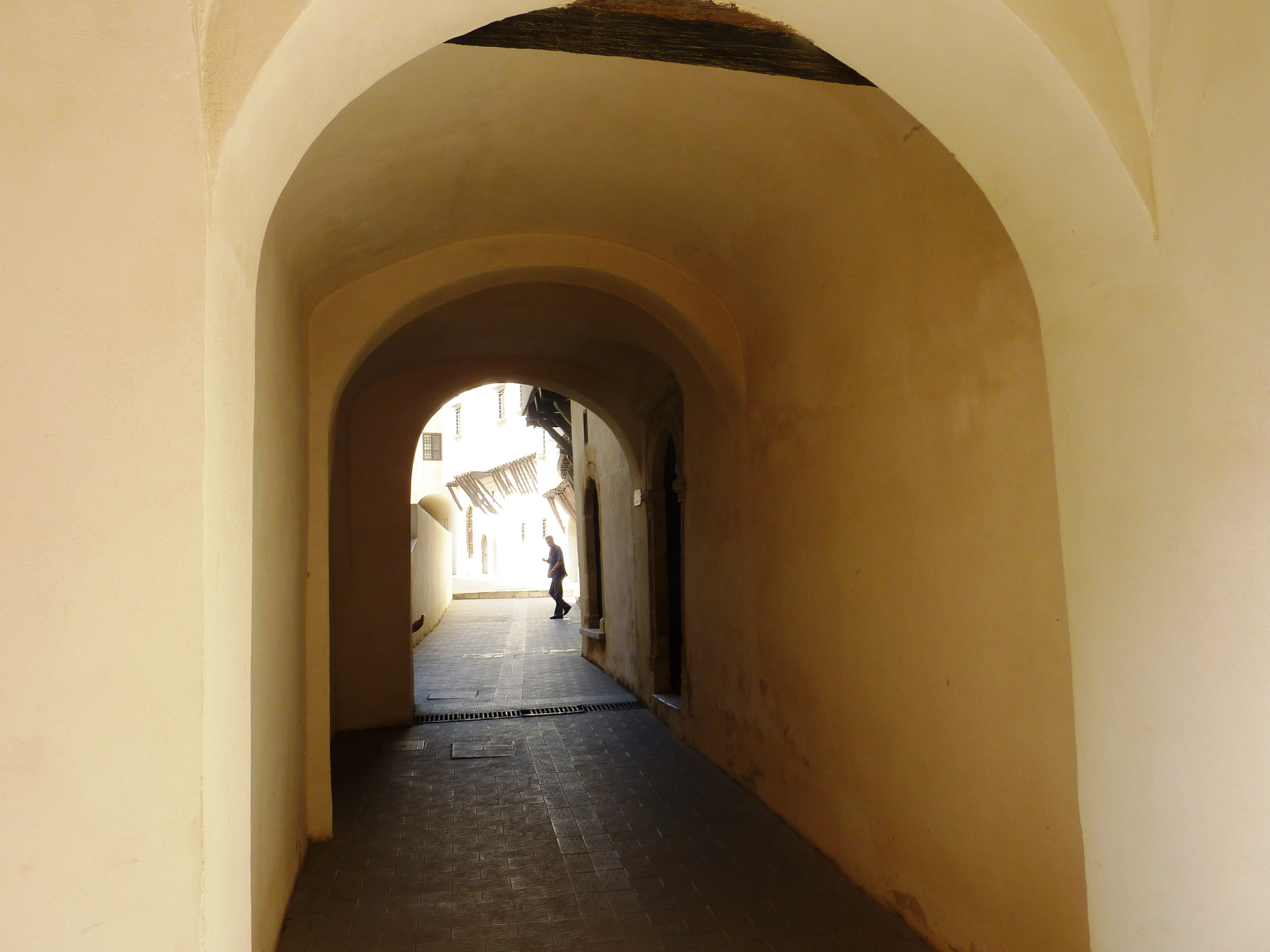

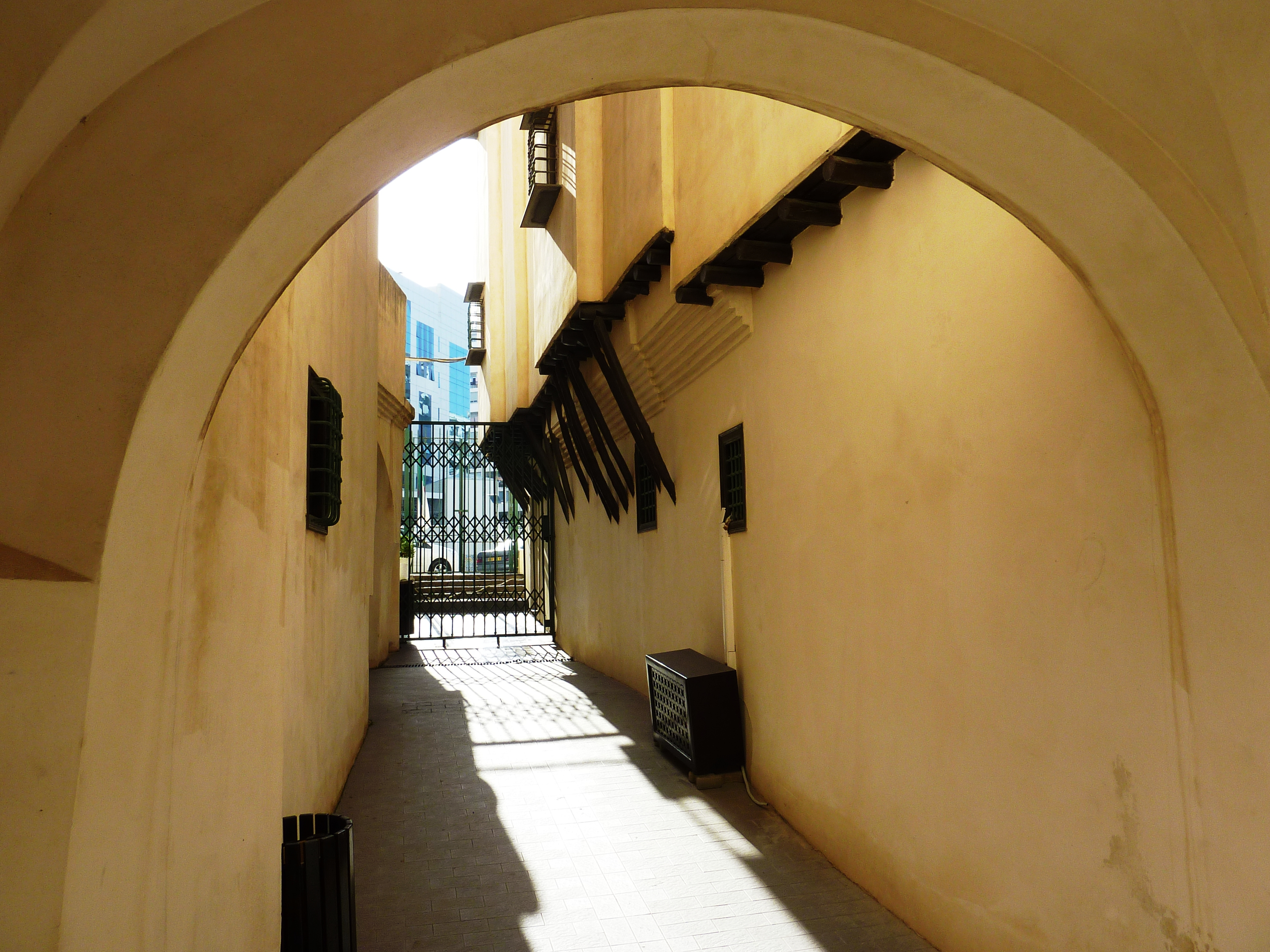

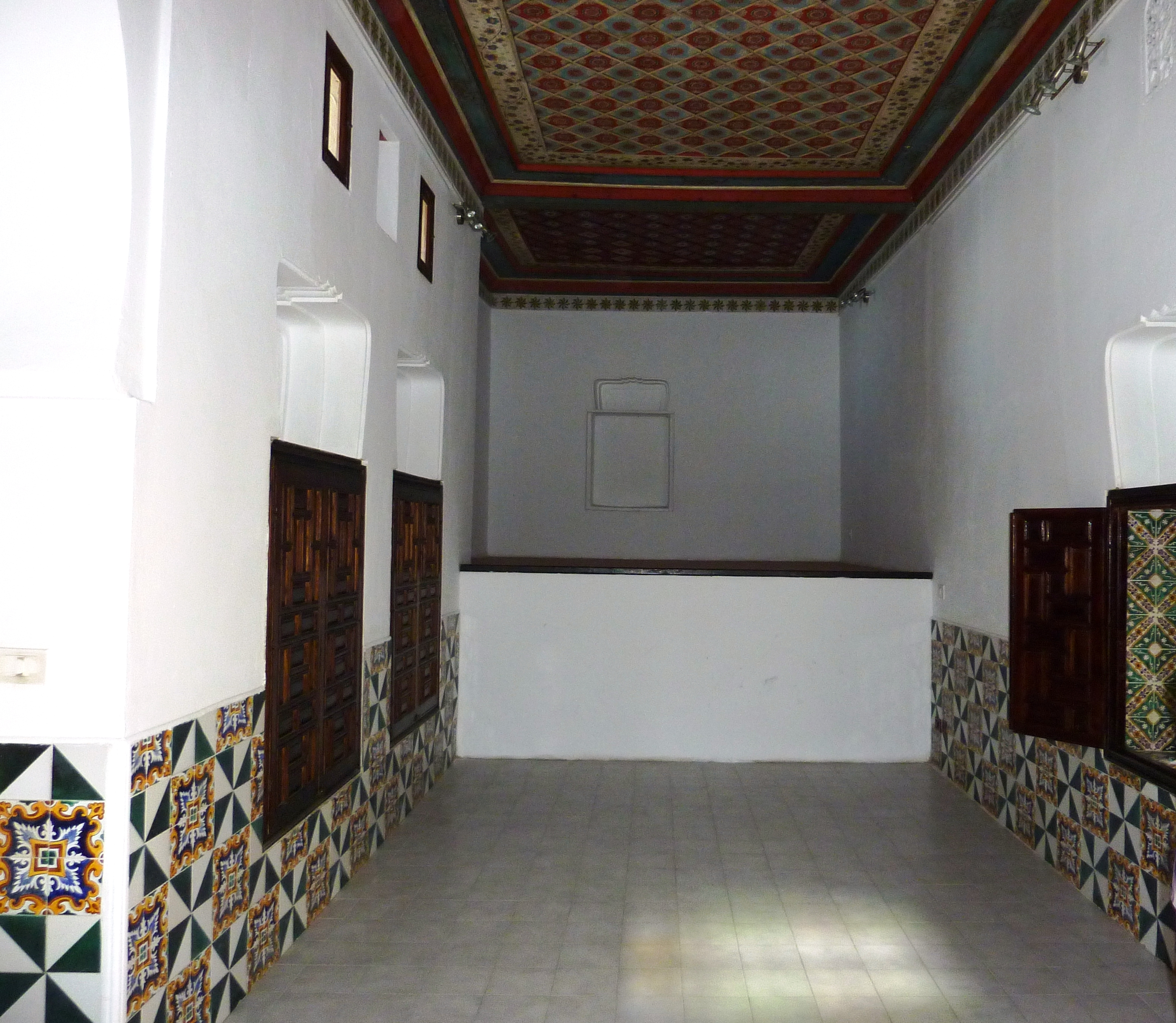

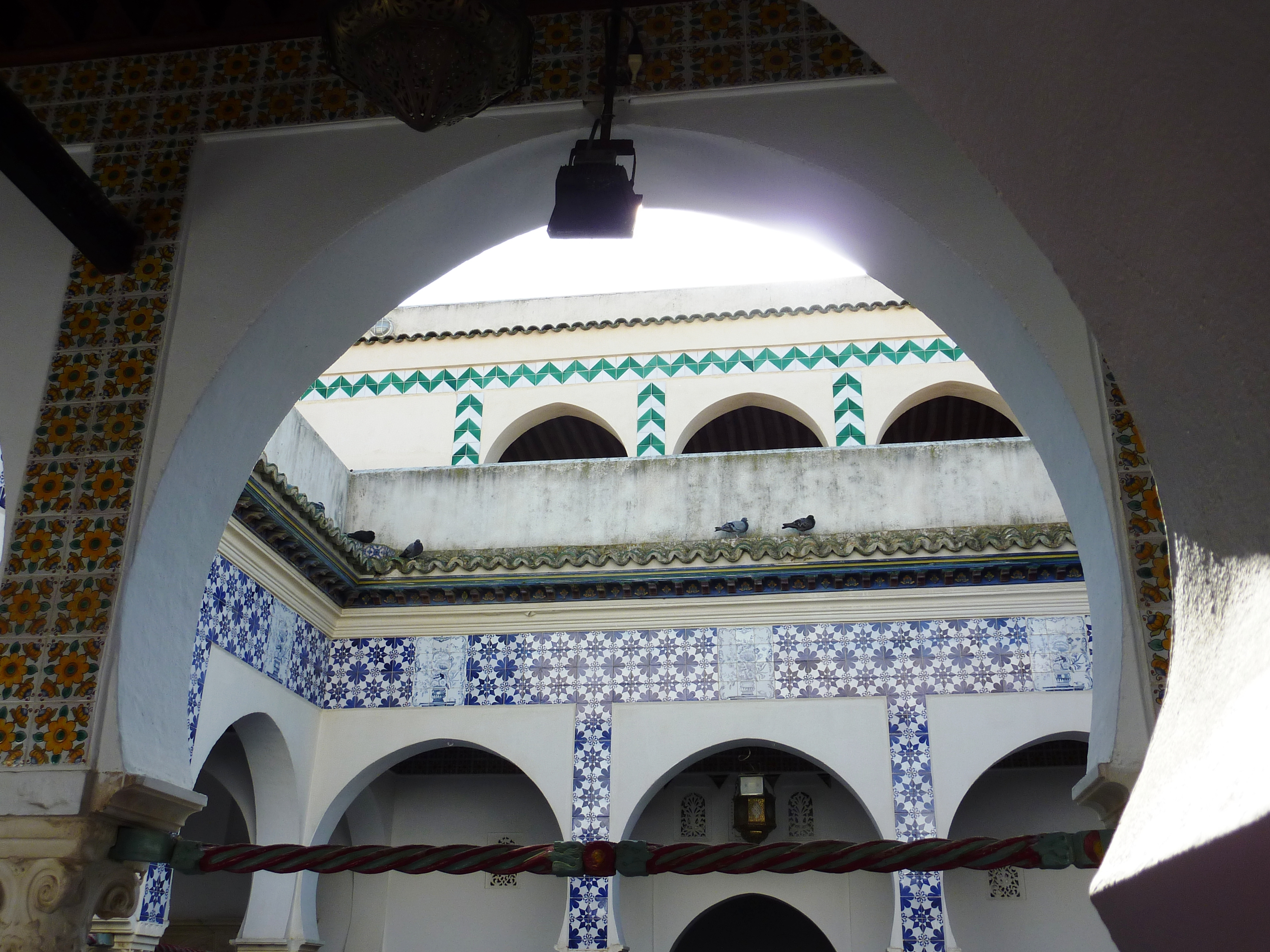

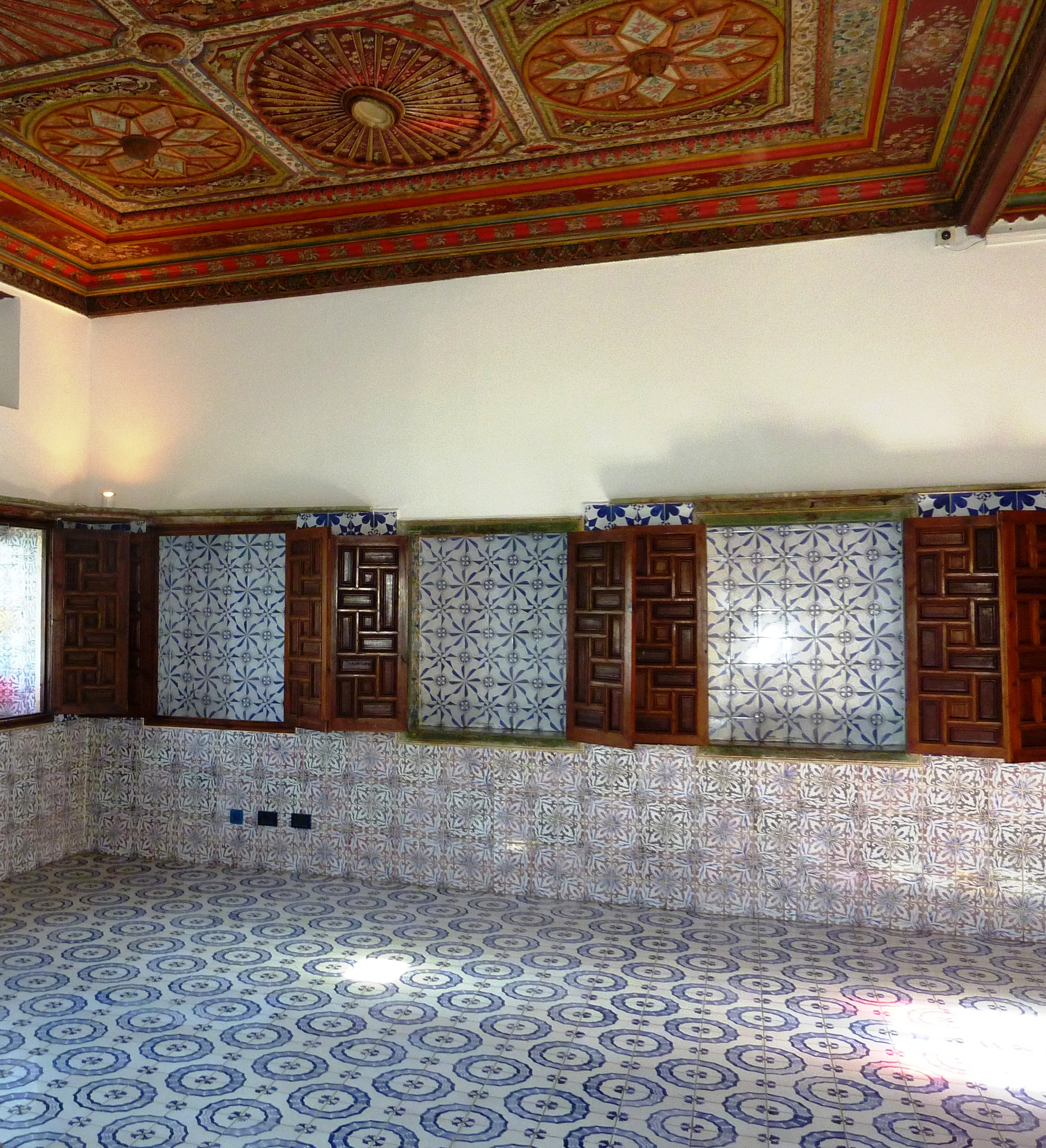

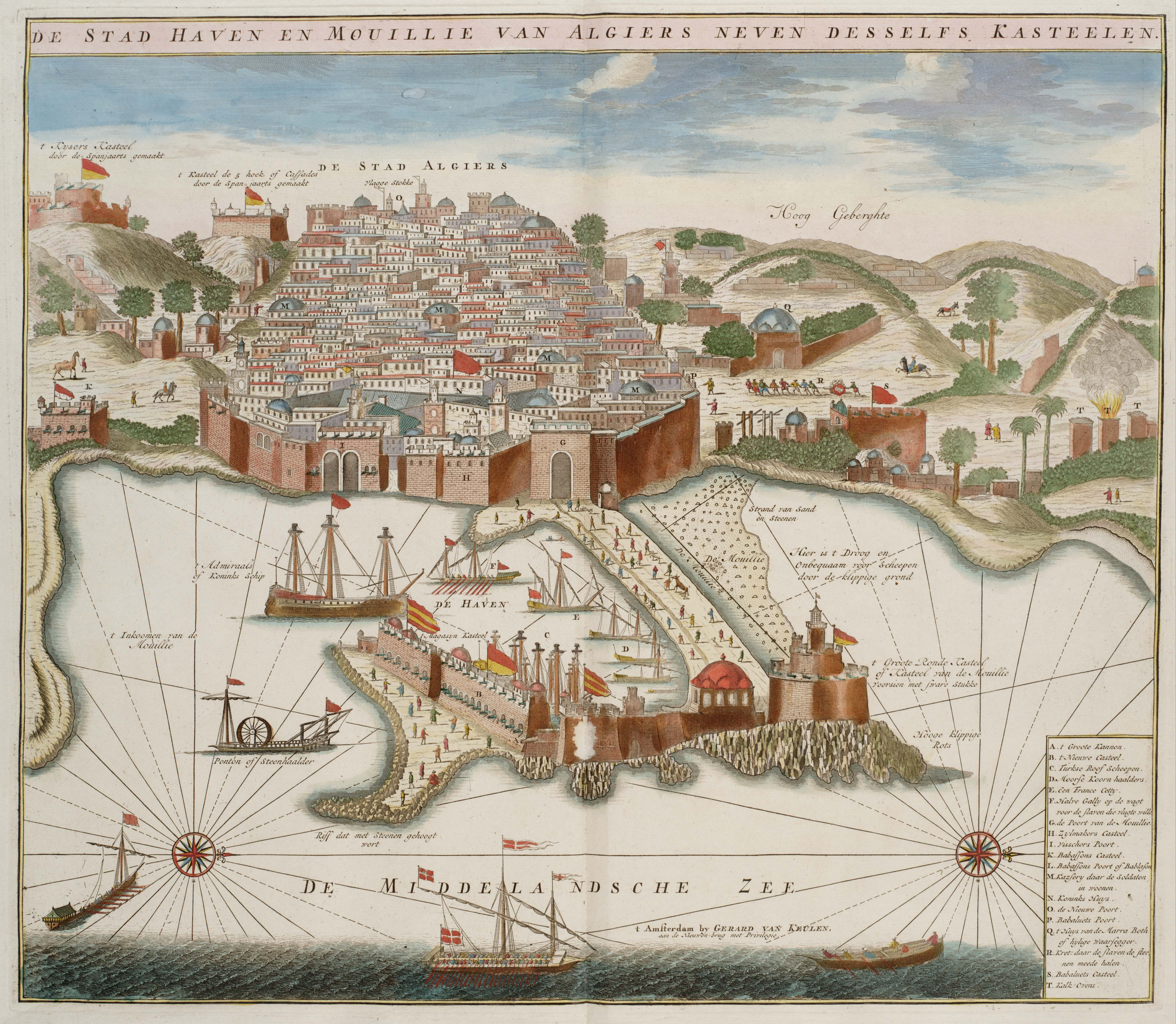
The Palace of the Riyas in 1690

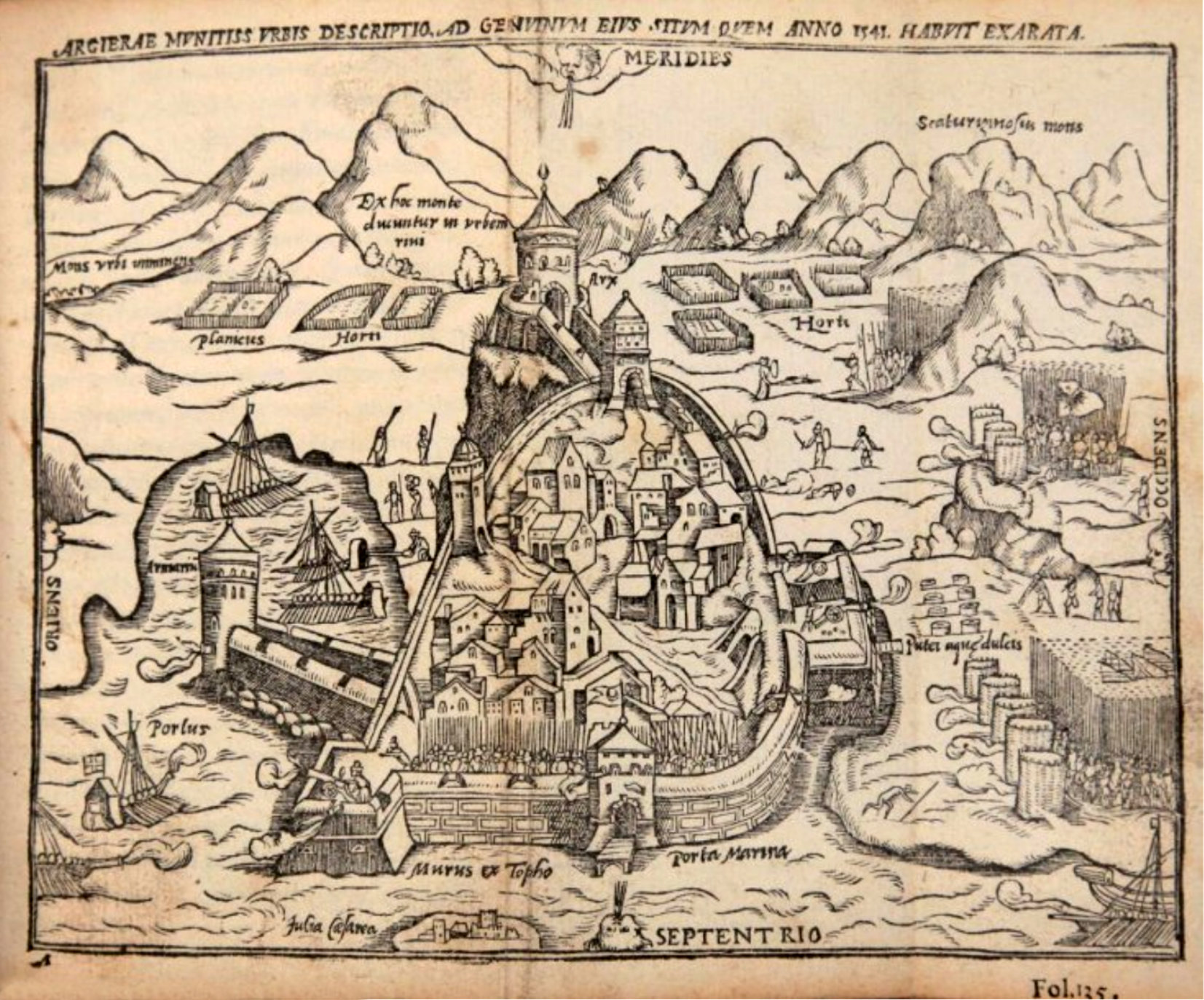
The Palace of the Riyas in 1541

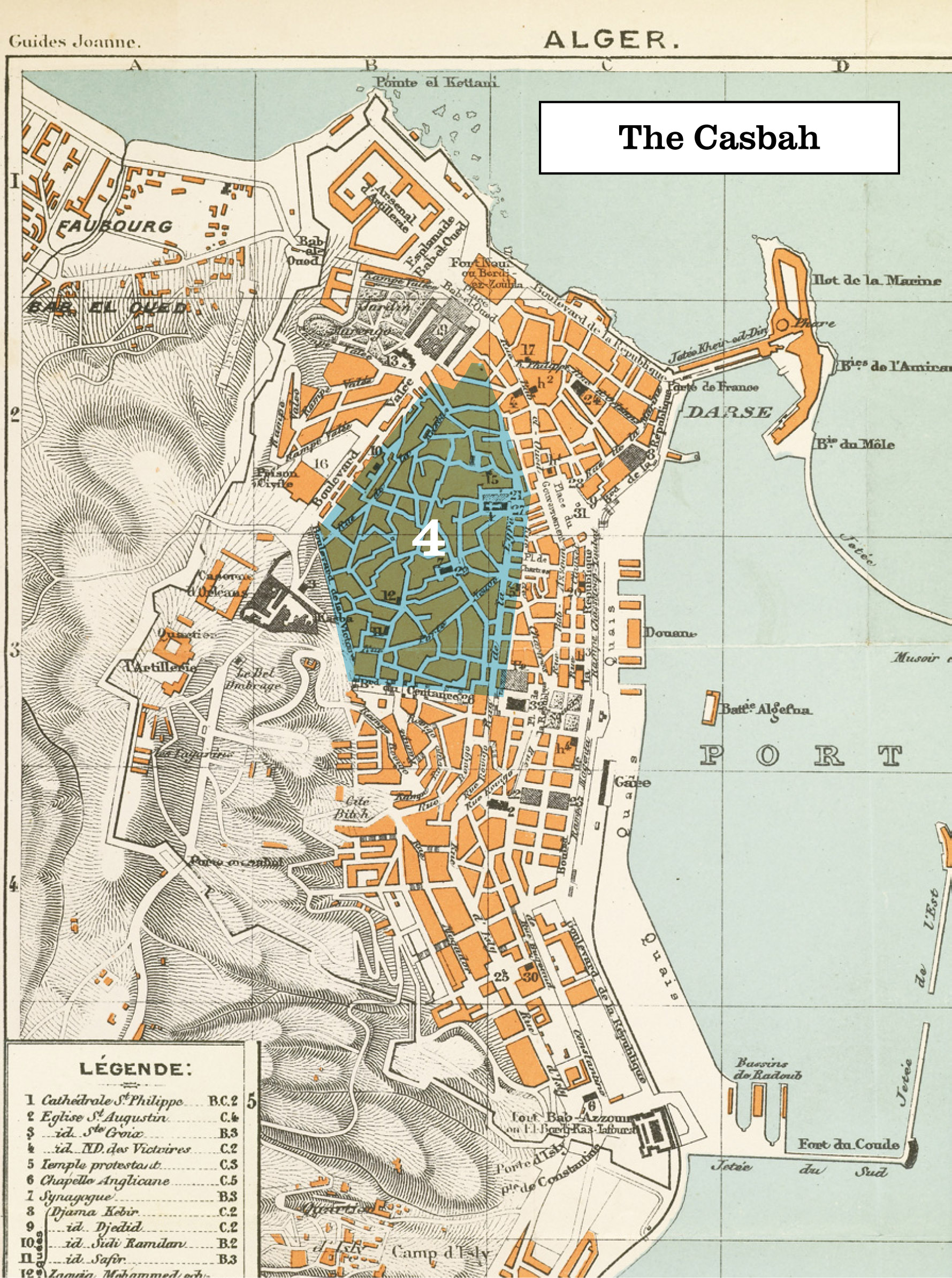
Palais des Rais Location

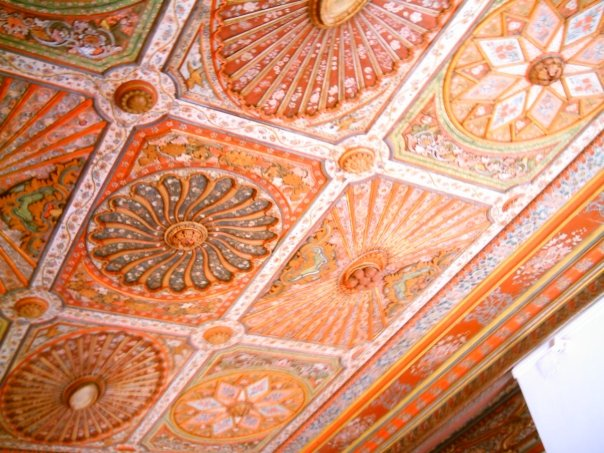
Decorative wooden ceiling in the dining hall of Palace 18

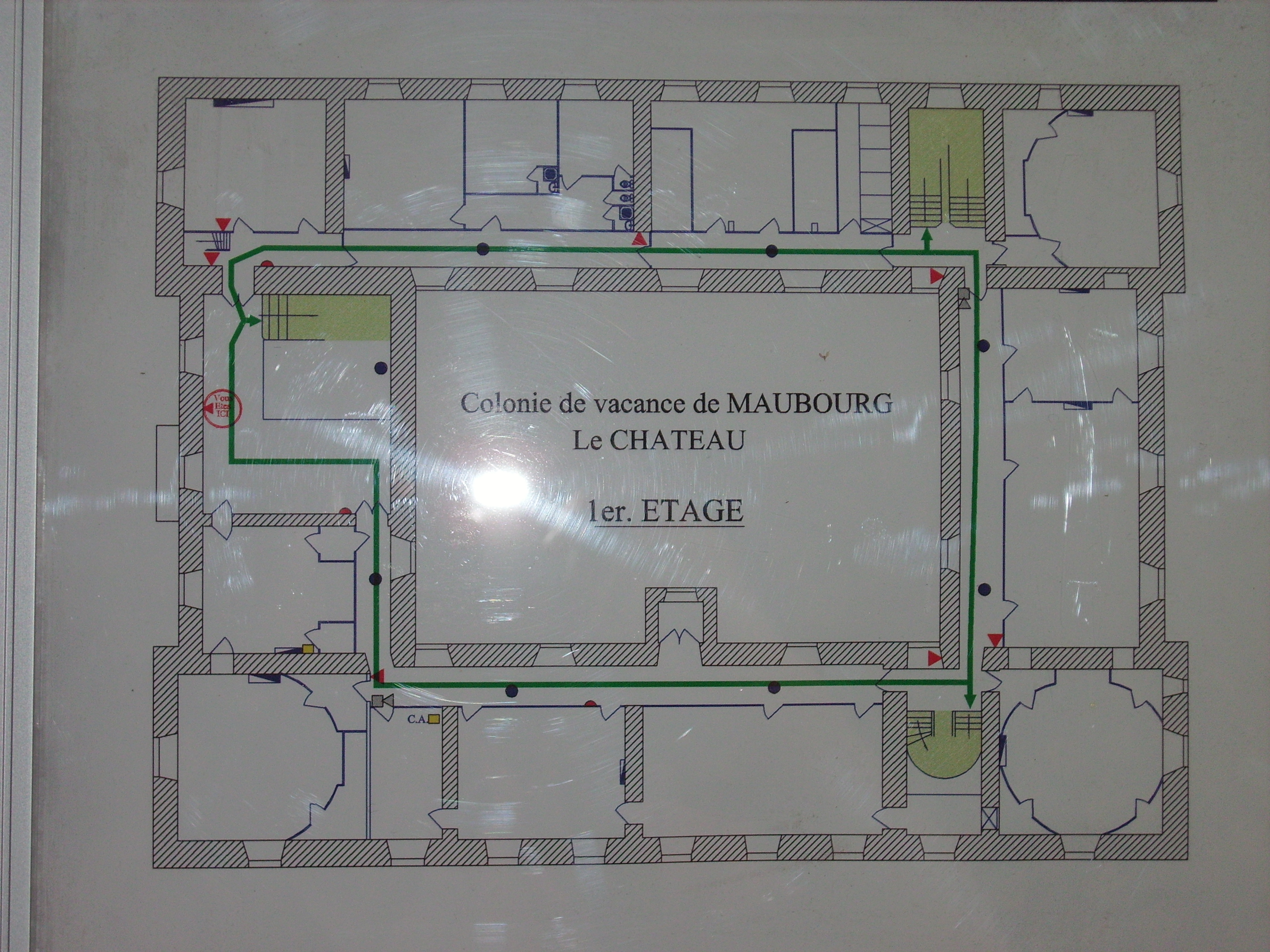
Palace Scheme 18

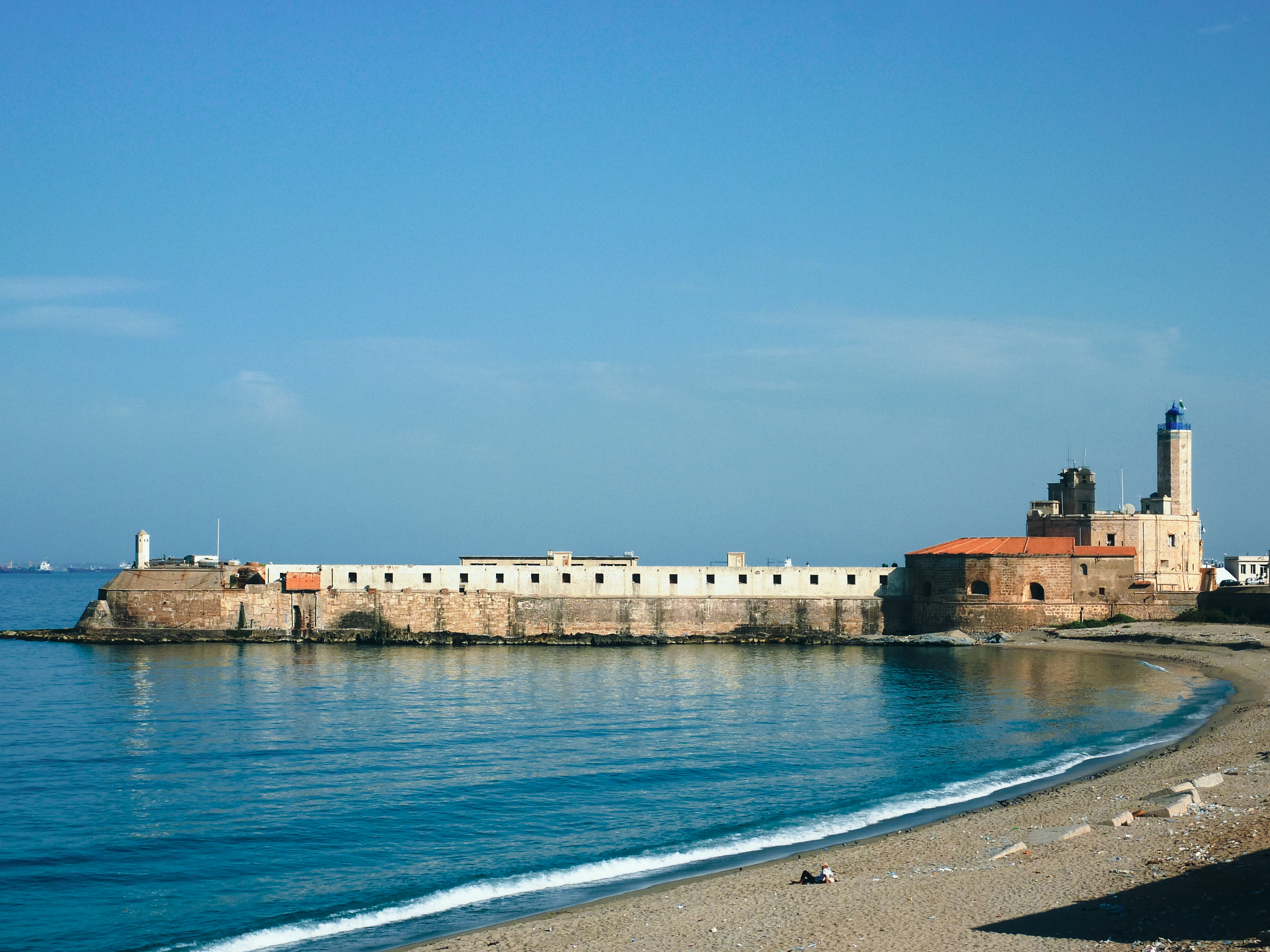

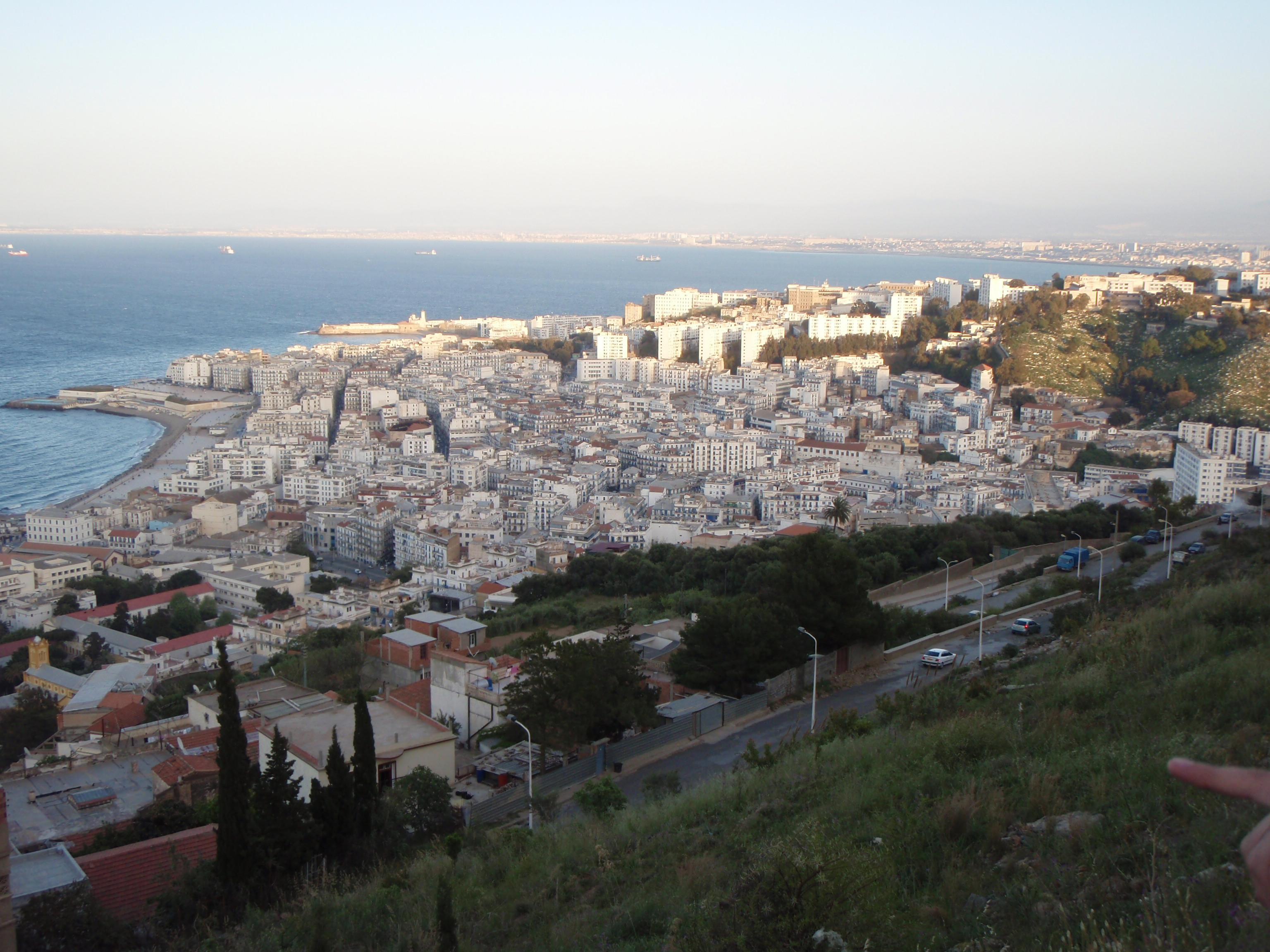
Prague Park

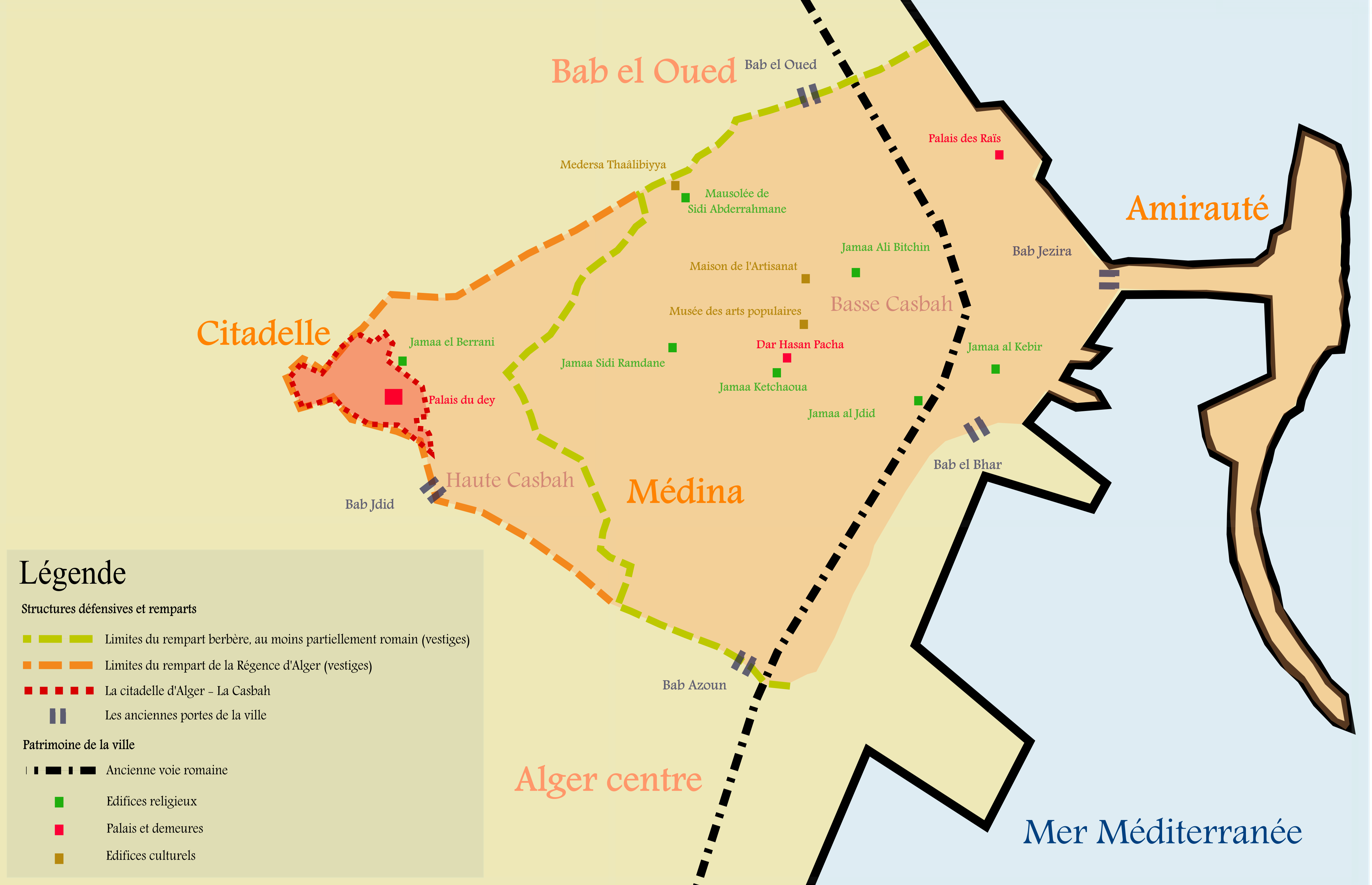
Palais des Rais Location

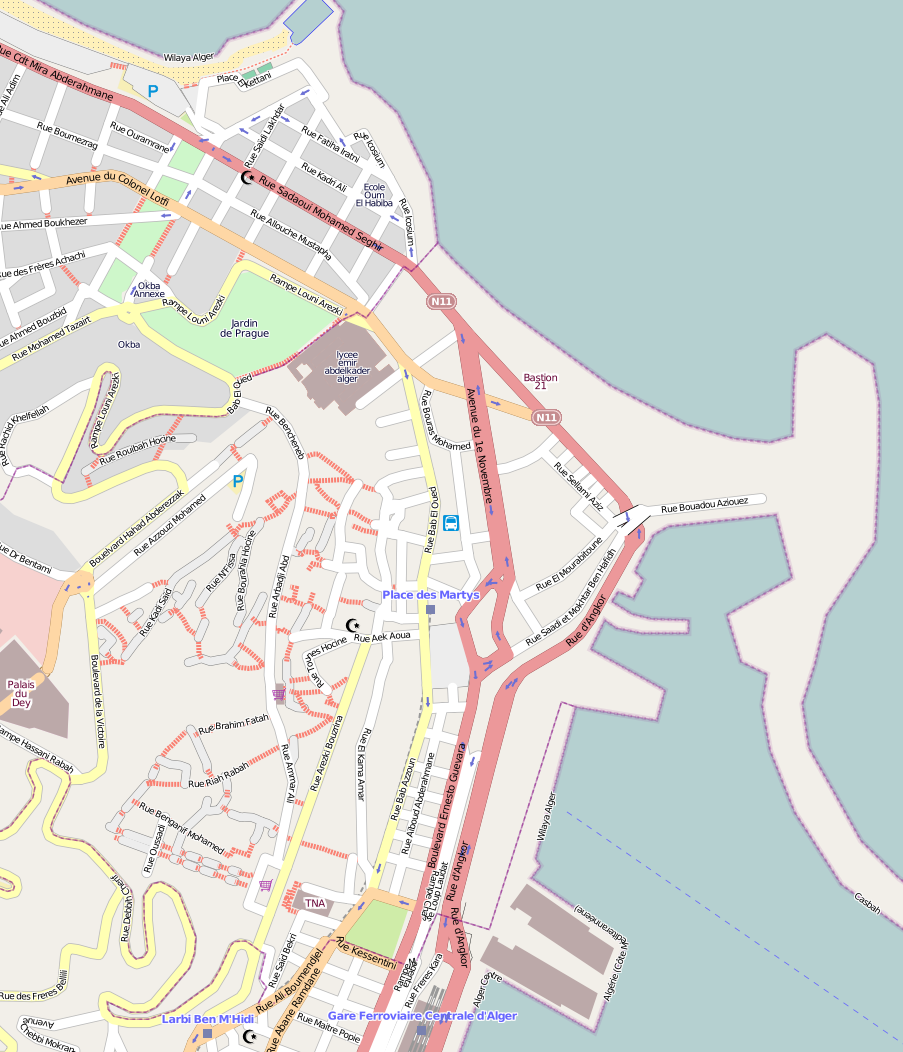
Palais des Rais Location

Casbah municipality

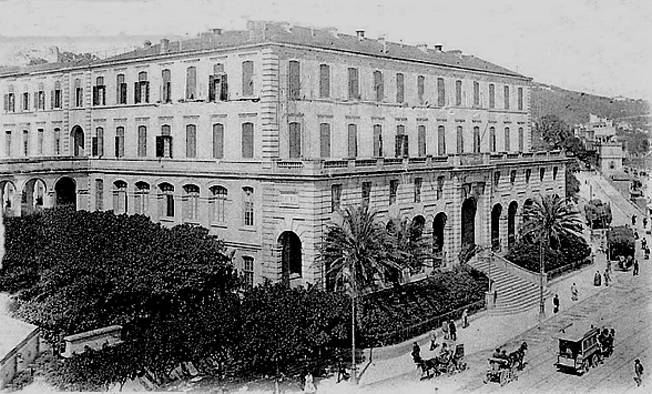
Amir Abdelkader High School

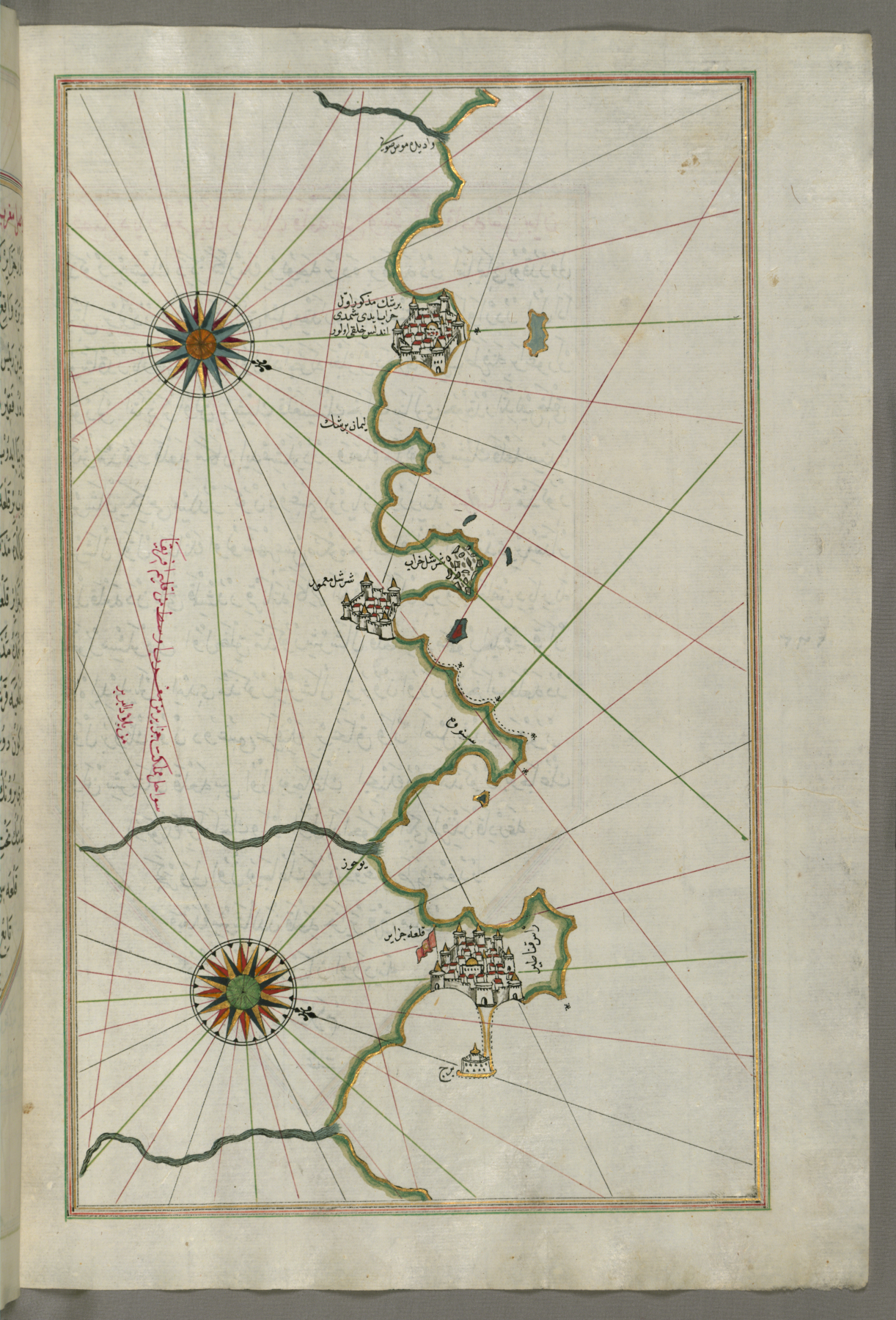
Palais des Rais Location in 1770 AD

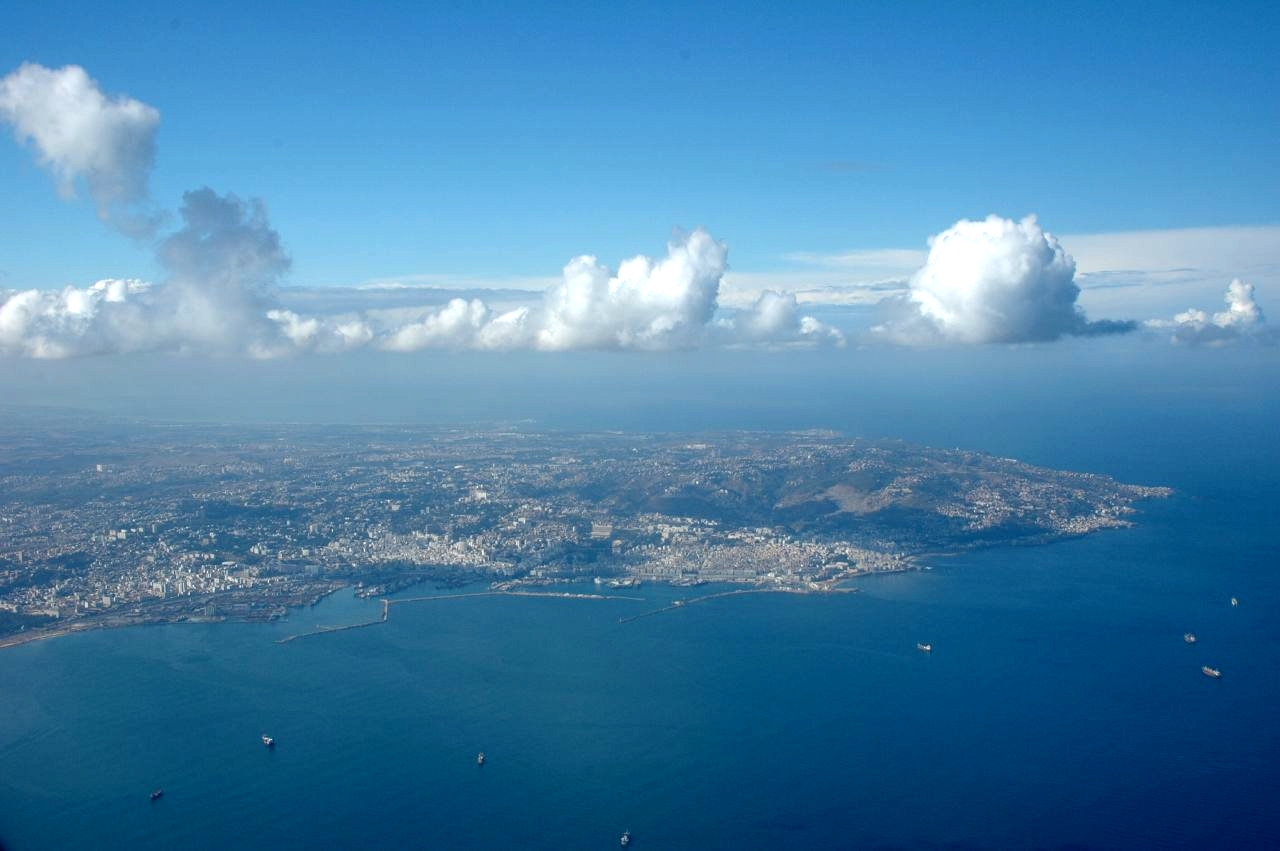
Gulf of Algeria

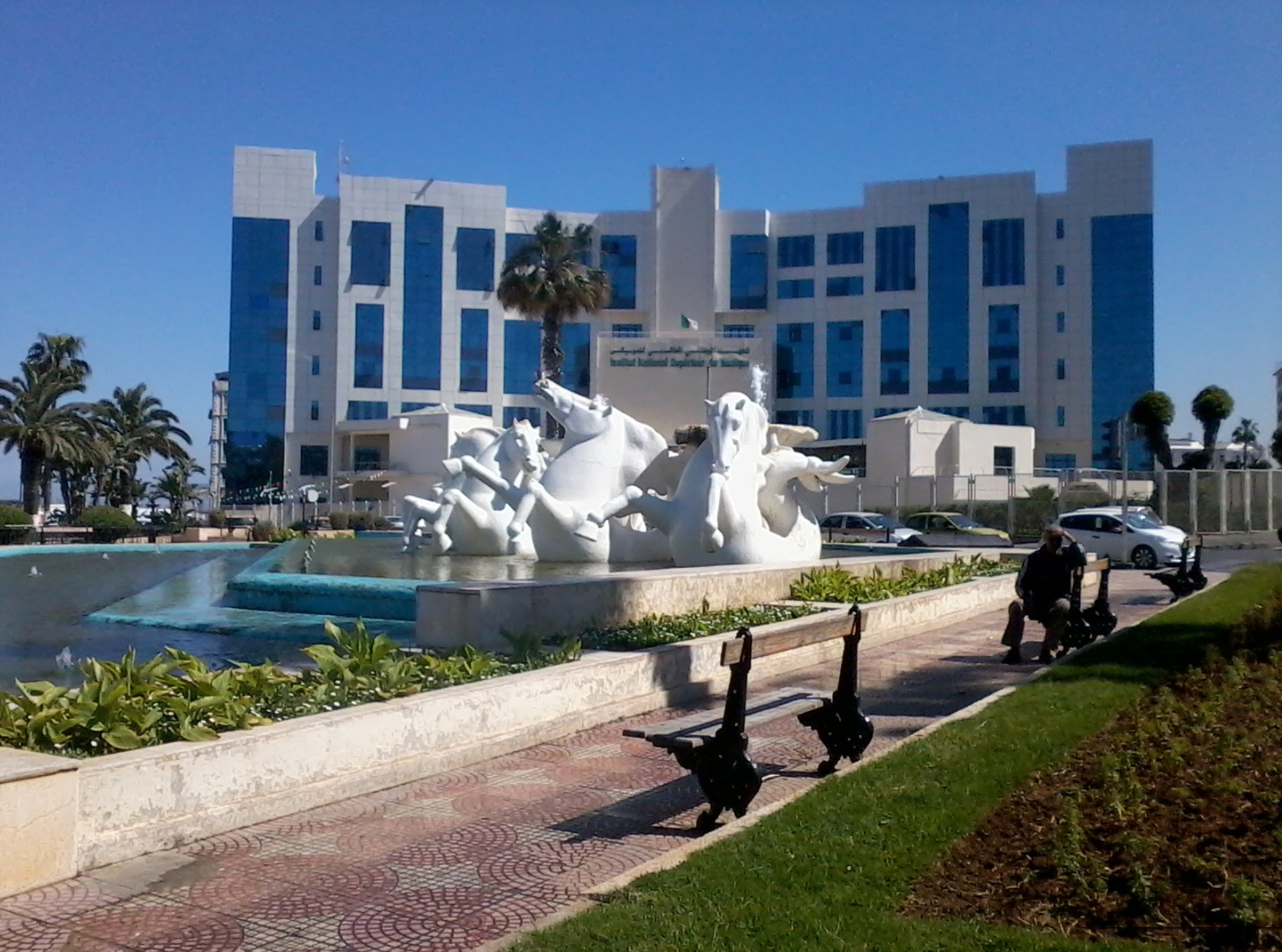
Higher National Conservatory of Music

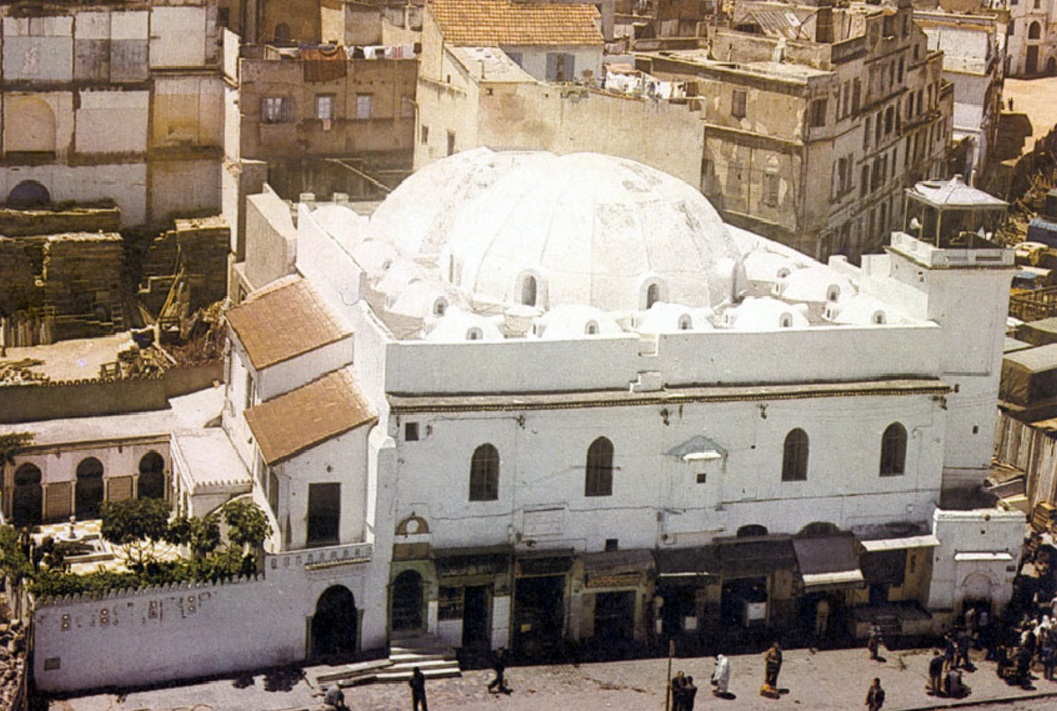
Ali Bitchin Mosque

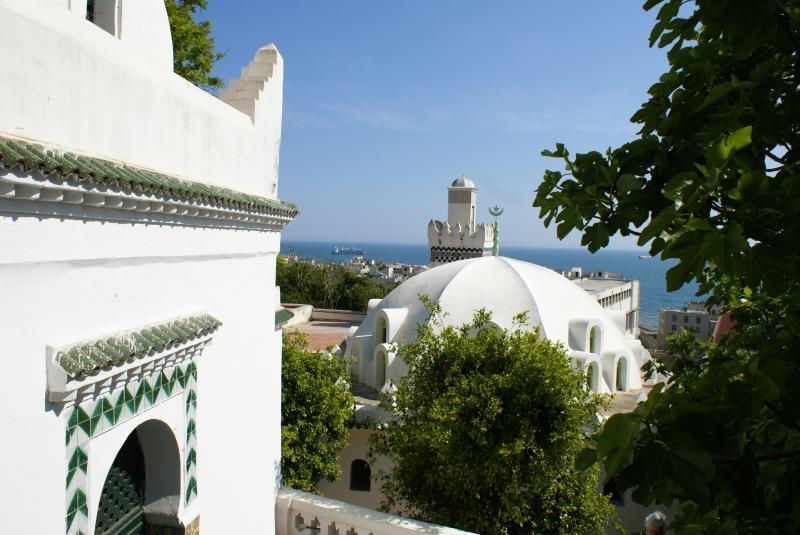
Sidi Abd al-Rahman al-Tha'alibi Mosque

== See also ==
- Bardo National Museum
- List of World Heritage Sites in Algeria
- Zaouïa of Sidi Saâdi
