= Zaouïa of Sidi Saâdi =

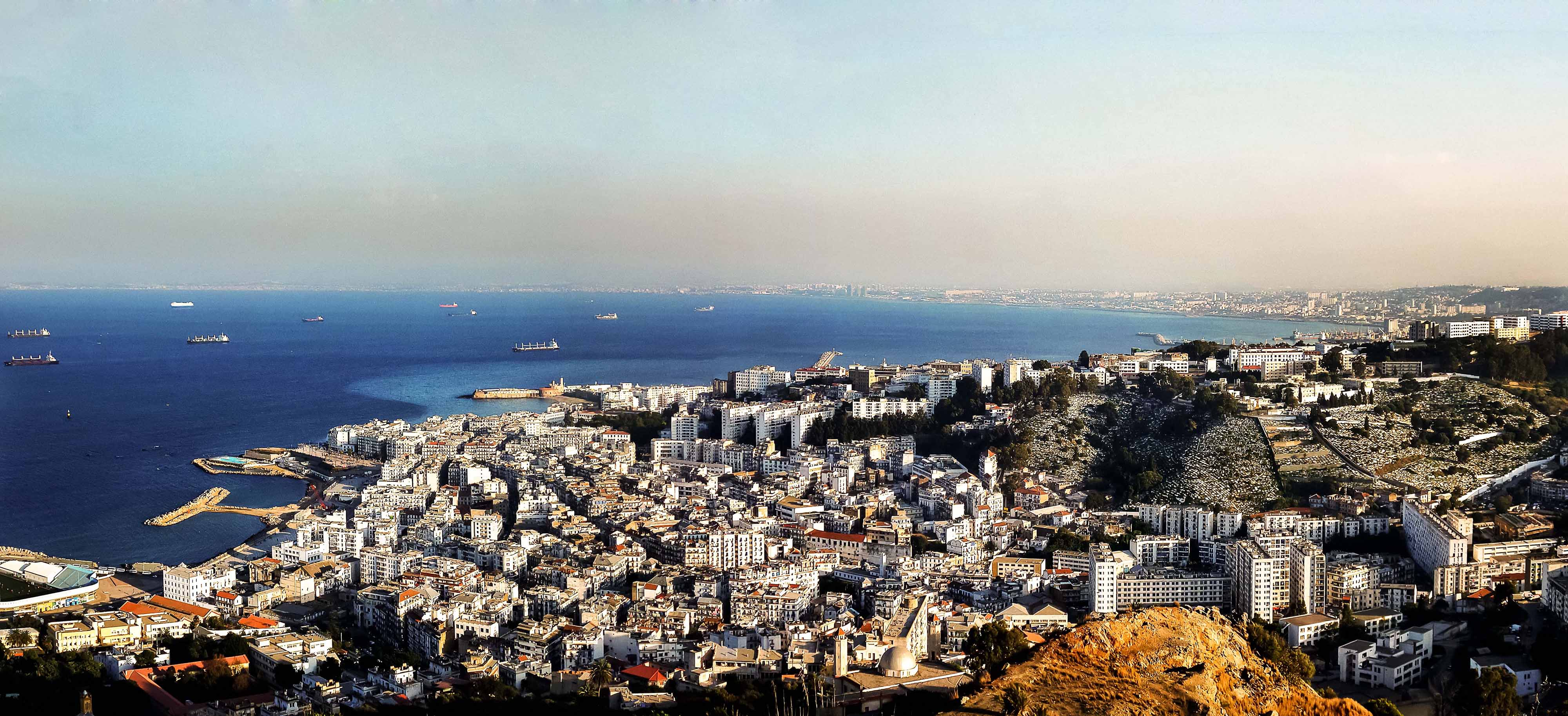
- Zaouïa of Sidi Saâdi

Location
- Kettani, Daïra of Bab El Oued; province of Wilaya; Algiers, 16000; Algeria; 36.7888761°N 3.0585122°E

Information
- Type: Zaouïa
- Motto: Rahmaniya
- Established: 1706
- Oversight: Ministry of Religious Affairs and Wakfs; Algerian Islamic reference
- Language: Arabic, Tamazight
- Affiliation: Sufi orders: Rahmaniya brotherhood; Tharahmanith; Khalwatiyya; Branches: Sufi; Sunni; Maliki
- Website: marw.dz

The Zaouïa of Sidi Saâdi (also rendered Zawiya of Sidi Saâdi) is a religious building and educational institution located in Algiers, Algeria. It is one of the Zawiyas in Algeria affiliated with the Rahmaniya Sufi order under the supervision of the Ministry of Religious Affairs and Wakfs, in accordance with the Algerian Islamic reference.

The full name of its founder Sidi Saâdi, the learned faqīh, is Abou Abdallah Mohamed ben Mohamed Saâdi.

== Establishment ==
The zaouïa is located above what is now the Jardin de Prague in the Kettani neighborhood of Bab El Oued; it is bounded to its north by Rampe Arezki Louni Rise, a street named after Arabic: أرزقي لوني, romanized: Arezki Louni).

The theologian and jurist Sidi Saâdi founded the zaouïa in the year 1706 CE of the Gregorian calendar (equivalent to 1118 Hijri), after acquiring about five hectares (12 acres) of land at the western exit of the Casbah of Algiers. The land overlooked the bay of Algiers and the estuary where the Oued Mkacel flows. The history of the Casbah of Algiers mentions that it was Mezzo Morto Hüseyin Pasha, then Raïs of the Regency of Algiers, who rewarded Sidi Saâdi for his religious activities in the Algerian city, allowing him to acquire this land.

The dilapidated buildings that existed on the large plot were refurbished after its acquisition, and several other buildings were erected over a year of sustained work. Upon completion of the new version of the zaouïa in 1707, this place of worship was then registered in the Habous records of Dar Es-Soltane.

=== Facilities ===
When completed, the zaouïa of Sidi Saâdi included the following facilities:

- A mosque without a minaret, with a roof in tiles in the Berber architectural style.
- A house for the cheikh of the zaouïa
- Classrooms for teaching the Qur'an and Islamic sciences
- Accommodation for the disciples

== Waqfs ==
The zaouïa of Sidi Saâdi funded its operations and maintenance through revenues generated from various waqf properties it owned.

These waqfs or endowments included:

- Farmlands
- Three rental houses
- Two pottery workshops
- Two retail shops

The income from these waqf properties enabled the zaouïa to sustain its religious, educational, and social activities.

== Mausoleum ==
The mausoleum honoring Sidi Saâdi is located within the zaouïa's enclosure, where he was buried upon his death in 1734 CE, equivalent to 1147 Hijri.

It was registered as a protected building in the records of Dar Es-Soltane by a notarial deed.

The dome containing the mazar (shrine) is less than a kilometer (about 0.62 mi) from the Zaouïa of Sidi Abderrahmane Et-Thaalibi and the Emir Abdelkader High School.

Visitors practice tawassul and du'a according to the precepts of the Algerian Islamic reference.

== Importance ==
The zaouïa of Sidi Saâdi played a significant role in the spiritual and social life of Algiers. It served as a center for Islamic education and the dissemination of the Rahmaniya order's teachings. It was also a place of refuge and support for the needy, embodying the principles of charity and community service central to the Sufi tradition.

== Decline and restoration ==
Over the years, the influence and activities of the zaouïa diminished due to various socio-political changes in Algeria. The site itself experienced neglect and deterioration, reflecting broader changes in the urban landscape and religious practices in Algiers.

There have been initiatives to restore and preserve the zaouïa of Sidi Saâdi as part of efforts to maintain Algeria's cultural and religious heritage. These efforts aim to revitalize the zaouïa as a historical landmark and a living center of Sufi practice and community life.
