= Atilius Fortunatianus =

4th century Latin grammarian

Atilius Fortunatianus (flourished in the 4th century A.D.) was a Latin grammarian. He was the author of a treatise on metres, dedicated to one of his pupils, a youth of senatorial rank, who desired to be instructed in the Horatian metres. The manual opens with a discussion of the fundamental ideas of metre and the chief rules of prosody, and ends with a detailed analysis of the metres of Horace. The chief authorities used are Caesius Bassus and the Latin adaptation by Juba the grammarian of the Τέχνη of Heliodorus. Fortunatianus being a common name in the African provinces, it is probable that the author was a countryman of Juba, Terentianus Maurus and Victorinus.

Atilius' work on metrical treatise depends on that of Caesius Bassus. His treatise on metrics also contains in the beginning some chapters on vowels, consonants and syllabus.

There is an edition of his Ars in H. Keil, Grammatici Latini, vi.; also published by him separately (1885).

== Discovery at Bobbio ==
In 1493 a sensational trove of grammatical and late-Roman poetry was discovered in Bobbio, and Atilius’s work was part of this discovery.
