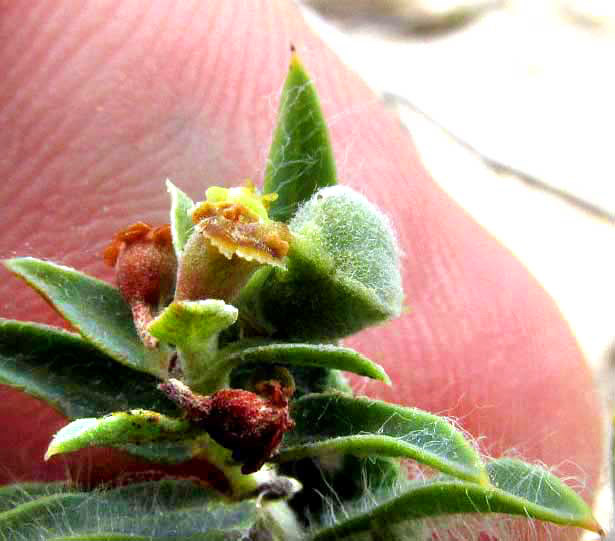
- Cyathium-type flower structure with immature fruit
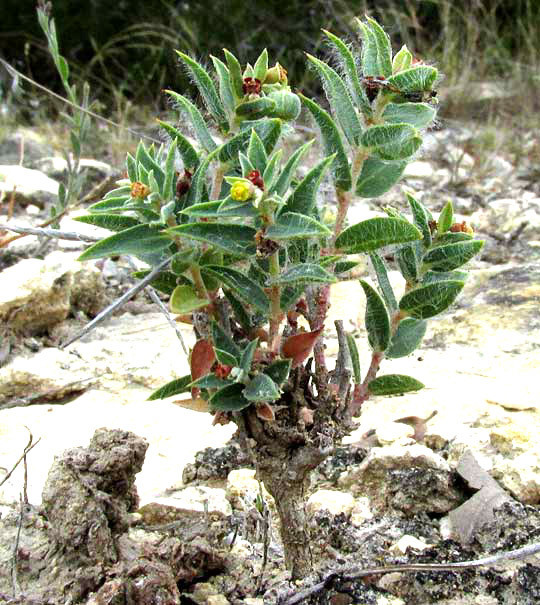
- Plant in habitat

Scientific classification
- Kingdom: Plantae
- Clade: Tracheophytes
- Clade: Angiosperms
- Clade: Eudicots
- Clade: Rosids
- Order: Malpighiales
- Family: Euphorbiaceae
- Genus: Euphorbia
- Species: E. acuta

Binomial name
- Euphorbia acuta Engelm. (1859)

Synonyms
- Chamaesyce acuta Millsp. (1916); Euphorbia georgei Oudejans (1989); Euphorbia acuta var. stenophylla Boiss (1862)

= Euphorbia acuta =

Species of plant

Euphorbia acuta, the pointed sandmat, is a species of flowering plant.

== Description ==
Pointed sandmat is an herbaceous plant with a strongly thickened rootstock enabling it to be a perennial. It stands erect, up to 30 cm (12 in) tall. Its leaves and stems are uniformly and densely covered with short to silky, white to gray hairs. Leaves, up to 20 mm (0.8 in) long and 8 mm (0.3 in) wide are narrowly to broadly egg-shaped -- ovate to lanceolate.

As with all Euphorbia species, the flowers of Euphorbia acuta are tiny and unisexual but arranged in a manner that clusters of male and female flower look like just one small blossom. Such structures are known as pseudanthia. Pseudanthia of the genus Euphorbia are of the special form known as cyathia. Each cyathium of Euphorbia acuta contains 20-25 male flowers consisting only of a single stamen; these surround the one stalked, female flower. As the female flower's ovary enlarges, the stalk may grow longer so that the ovary hangs outside the cyathium, as it matures into a seed-bearing fruit.

== Distribution ==
The native range of this species is the south-central USA and into the northern extreme parts of the northern Mexican states of Chihuahua and Coahuila

== Habitat ==
In Texas, Euphorbia acuta is described as growing mainly on dry limestone uplands of the Edwards Plateau, and shrublands in the Semi-arid climate zone.

== Ecology ==
Fewer than 1% of green plant species are known to use the C_{2} photosynthetic pathway. Most plants use C_{3} or C_{4} photosynthesis. Euphorbia acuta uses C_{2} photosynthesis. It has been theorized that the C_{2} pathway enables the species using it to deal better with environmental stresses.

== Etymology ==
The genus name Euphorbia honors Euphorbus, a first-century A.D. Greek physician.

The species name acuta is the Latin feminine form of acutus, meaning sharp-pointed.

== Taxonomy ==
In 1859 the taxon Euphorbia acuta Engelm. -- in 1836 there also had been an illegitimately published Euphorbia acuta Bellardi ex Colla from Eurasia -- was published in Volume 2, Part 1 of the "Report on the United States and Mexican boundary survey :made under the direction of the secretary of the Interior". The report was authored by the surveyor William H. Emory. During the surveying of the US/Mexico boundary, plants were collected, and the German-American botanist George Engelmann studied them. When a taxon was thought to be new to science, Engelmann published them, Latin descriptions and all. That's when Euphorbia acuta Engelm. came into being. In Engelmann's publication we read that the type specimen was found in "Stony prairies western Texas, along the San Pedro and Pecos rivers &c."
