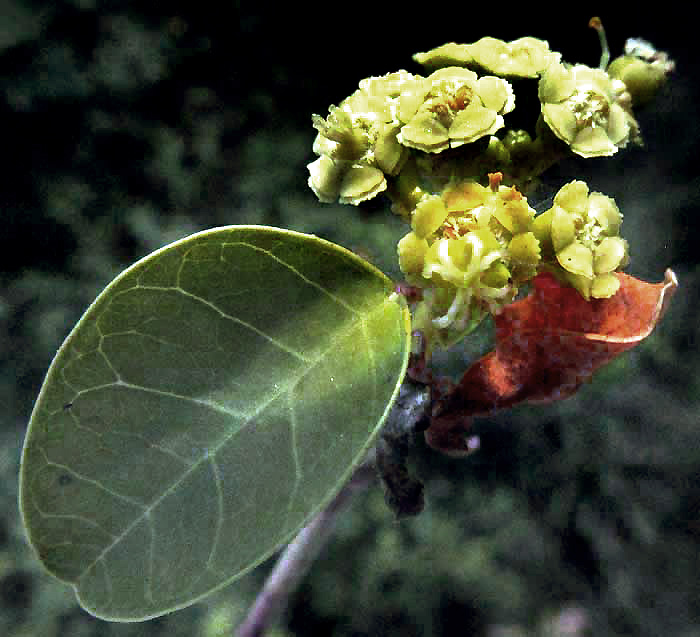
- Cyathia and leaf

Scientific classification
- Kingdom: Plantae
- Clade: Embryophytes
- Clade: Tracheophytes
- Clade: Angiosperms
- Clade: Eudicots
- Clade: Rosids
- Order: Malpighiales
- Family: Euphorbiaceae
- Genus: Euphorbia
- Species: E. schlechtendalii

Binomial name
- Euphorbia schlechtendalii Boiss.

Varieties
- See text.

Synonyms
- Of var. schlechtendalii: Aklema adinophylla (Donn.Sm.) Millsp.; Aklema friderichsthalii (Boiss.) Millsp.; Aklema mayana (Millsp.) Millsp.; Aklema nelsonii (Millsp.) Millsp.; Aklema ovata (Schltdl.) Millsp.; Alectoroctonum ovatum Schltdl.; Euphorbia adinophylla Donn.Sm.; Euphorbia friderichsthalii Boiss.; Euphorbia mayana Millsp.; Euphorbia nelsonii Millsp.

= Euphorbia schlechtendalii =

Species of plant

Euphorbia schlechtendalii, with no English name, is a species of subshrub, shrub or small tree occurring in Mexico and Central America. It belongs to the family Euphorbiaceae.

== Description ==
Euphorbia schlechtendalii is distinctive among the roughly 2,000 Euphorbia species, if only because often it grows into a small tree. In Mexico, where around 245 Euphorbia species are listed, only ten Euphorbia species are considered trees – standing 5 m (16 ft) or higher; Euphorbia schlechtendalii sometimes reaches 10 m (33 ft) tall. Other features of Euphorbia schlechtendalii are:

- The hairless plant's new twigs are reddish, though lichens of other colors may cover older parts; stem nodes where leaves arise tend to be swollen.
- At stem nodes, usually more than two leaves arise on unusually slender petioles up to 3 cm (1.2 in) long. Blades up to 3 cm (1.2 in) long and 2 cm (0.79 in) wide are generally egg-shaped to nearly round, and have entire margins with no teeth, lobes or indentations.
- Cyathia are held in compact clusters arising from stem nodes and tips. Each cyathium bears five flat, nearly round glands, and each gland bears an appendage forming a wide, white to greenish yellow, winglike border, the margin of which may be with or without indentations; the appendages give the impression of the cyathium bearing five broad, short petals.
- Fruits are capsules up to 4 mm (0.16 in) long held well above the cyathia on sturdy pedicels.
- Seeds are egg-shaped with surfaces bearing tiny, rounded projections and a fleshy growth near where the seed attaches to the capsule; it is "carunculated".

== Taxonomy ==
The name Euphorbia schlechtendalii was published by Pierre Edmond Boissier in 1860. Boissier referred to Alectoroctonum ovatum, published earlier by Diederich von Schlechtendal in 1846. The name Euphorbia ovata was not available, having already been published by Ernst Meyer in 1843–1844. As of March 2026, Plants of the World Online treated Alectoroctonum ovatum as a synonym of E. schlechtendalii var. schlechtendalii. In 1846 the type specimen was described by Diederich Franz Leonhard von Schlechtendal as from "Actopan, Papantla", which are two localities in the Mexican state of Veracruz. The local name was given as matagallina, which in Spanish means "chicken killer".

=== Varieties ===
As of March 2026, Plants of the World Online recognized the following varieties of Euphorbia schlechtendalii:

- Euphorbia schlechtendalii var. schlechtendalii
- Euphorbia schlechtendalii var. pacifica McVaugh
- Euphorbia schlechtendalii var. websteri McVaugh

=== Phylogeny ===
In 2012 a phylogenetic analysis found Euphorbia schlechtendalii to be sister to Euphorbia cotinifolia, in section Alectoroctonum of the subgenus Chamaesyce.

A later molecular phylogenetic analysis of 28 plastomes from Euphorbiaceae confirmed that Euphorbia schlechtendalii falls into the subgenus Chamaesyce.

=== Etymology ===
The genus name Euphorbia honors the first-century A.D. Greek physician Euphorbus.

The species name schlechtendalii honors the German botanist Diederich Franz Leonhard von Schlechtendal, who described the type specimen for Euphorbia schlechtendalii, giving it the name Alectoroctonum ovatum.

== Distribution ==
Euphorbia schlechtendalii occurs in states of central and southern Mexico on the Pacific and Gulf sides, and the Yucatan Peninsula; it is absent in the arid north and the Central Mexican matorral. It occurs in Central America as far south as Costa Rica

== Habitat ==
In Mexico's lowland Yucatan Peninsula, Euphorbia schlechtendalii inhabits tropical deciduous forests and coastal dune areas. Images on this page show an individual on thin soil atop limestone in a savanna near the Yucatan Peninsula's northern Gulf coast. In Nicaragua it occurs in open areas and dry forests up to 1,250 meters in elevation (4,100 feet).

== Ecology ==
In the Mexican state of Hidalgo, when male white-tailed deer choose their rutting areas, spots where Euphorbia schlechtendalii grow are among the least desired.

== Human uses ==
=== In traditional medicine ===
In Mexico's Oaxaca state, the white sap, or latex, that oozes from wounds of Euphorbia schlechtendalii is diluted in water and used for venereal diseases, and chest pains caused by foods. In Mexico's Yucatan Peninsula, mashed leaves are used against dandruff.

=== In bonsai ===
Among those who practice the "tray planting" Japanese art of bonsai trees, Euphorbia schlechtendalii is known as a tree with a slightly swollen, succulent trunk typical of arid, tropical environments. At maturity the thick trunk peels off parchment-like bark. It makes an attractive bonsai specimen if regular clipping is attended to. The goal is to produce a domed crown atop a thick, succulent trunk.

In Mexico, Euphorbia schlechtendalii is sold as a perfect plant for bonsai.

== Gallery ==
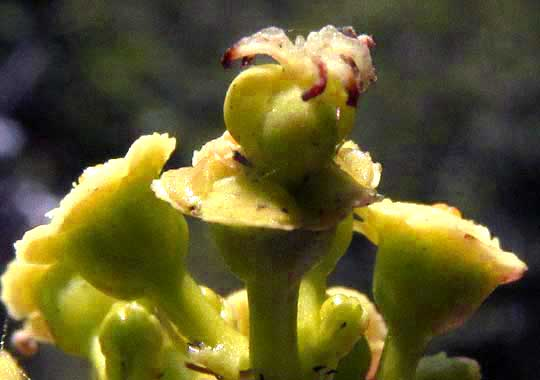
Cyathia

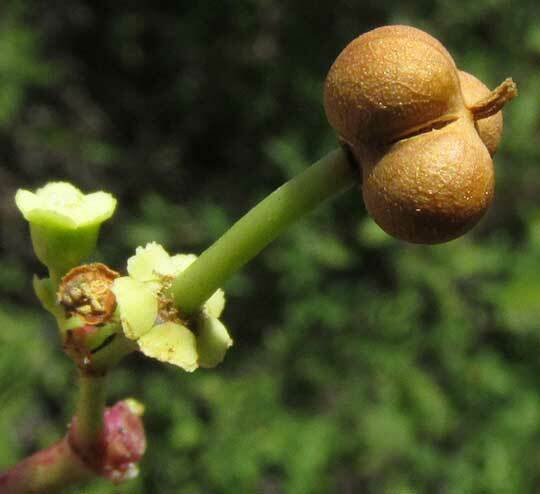
3-lobed capsular fruit atop pedicel

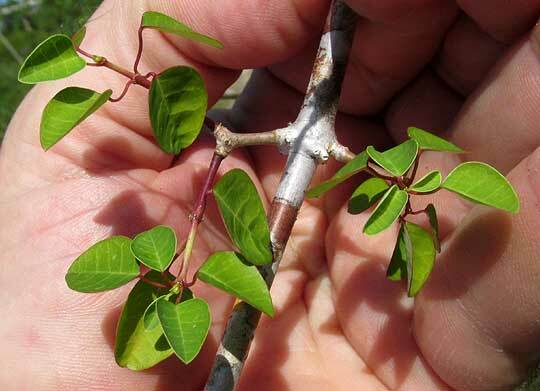
Leaves with slender ptioles

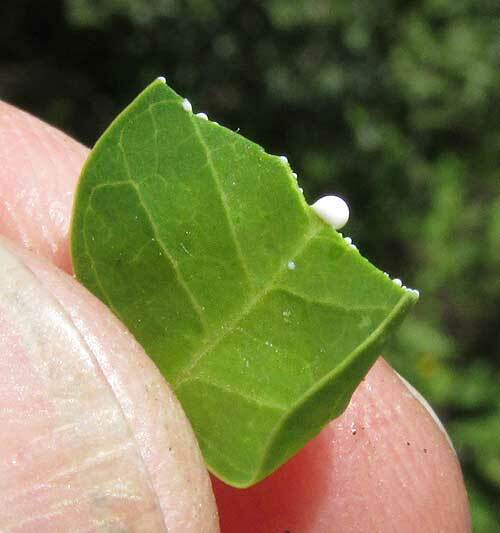
White, latex-like sap oozing from torn leaf

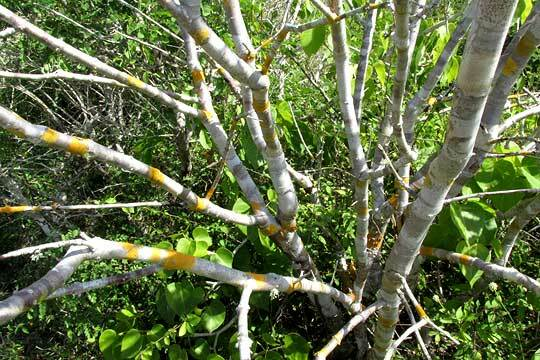
Base of tree bearing many lichens

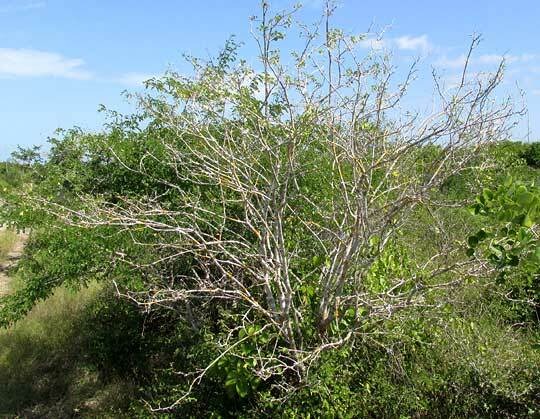
Tree in habitat
