= Royal Mausoleum of Mauretania =

Royal Mausoleum of Mauretania (Caesariensis)
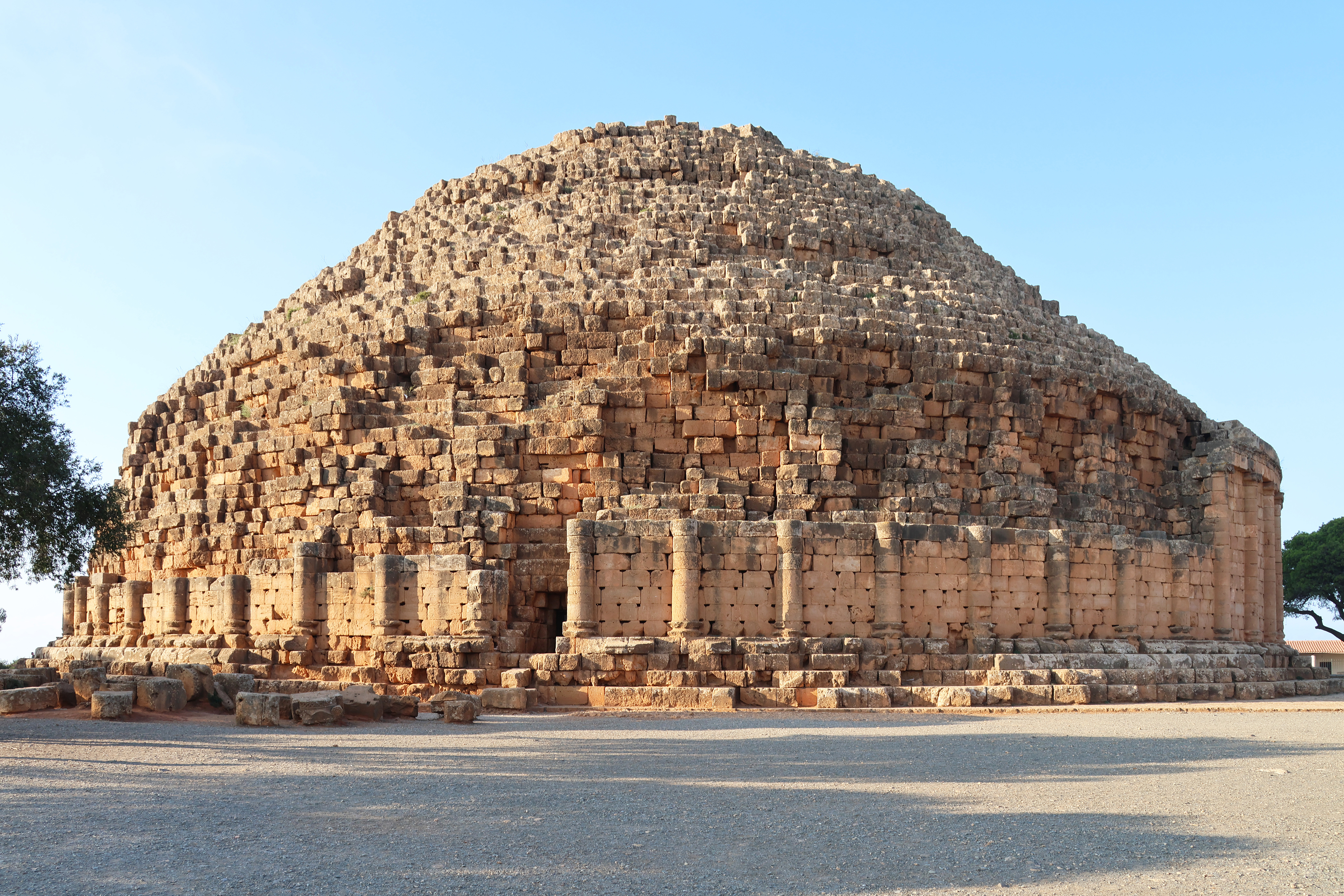
- Mausoleum of Mauretania Caesariensis

- Location within Algeria
- 36°34′29″N 2°33′12″E
- Location: Tipaza Province, Algeria

History
- Built: 3 BC

Site notes
- Architectural style: Royal Numidian Architecture

The Royal Mausoleum of Mauretania is a funerary monument located on the road between Cherchell and Algiers, in Tipaza Province, Algeria.

The mausoleum is the tomb where the Berber King Juba II (son of Juba I of Numidia) and the Queen Cleopatra Selene II, sovereigns of Mauretania, were allegedly buried. However, their human remains are no longer at the site.

The Royal Mausoleum of Mauretania is a common type of ancient mausoleums found in Algeria built on a hill some 250 metres (756 feet) above sea level. The monument is entirely built from stone, while its main structure is in a circular form with a square base topped by a cone or a pyramid. The square base measures 60 to 60.9 metres square or 200 to 209 foot. The height of the monument was originally about 40 metres or 130’ in height. Due to damage that the mausoleum has suffered from natural elements and vandalism, the monument now measures 30-32.4 metres in height.

The base of the monument was decorated with 60 Ionic columns whose capitals were removed, possibly stolen. Inside, the centre of the mausoleum has two vaulted chambers, separated by a short passage connected by a gallery outside by stone doors which can be moved up and down by levers. The passage leading to the chambers is about 500 feet. One chamber measures 142 feet long by 11 feet broad and is 11 feet high, while the other is smaller.

== History ==
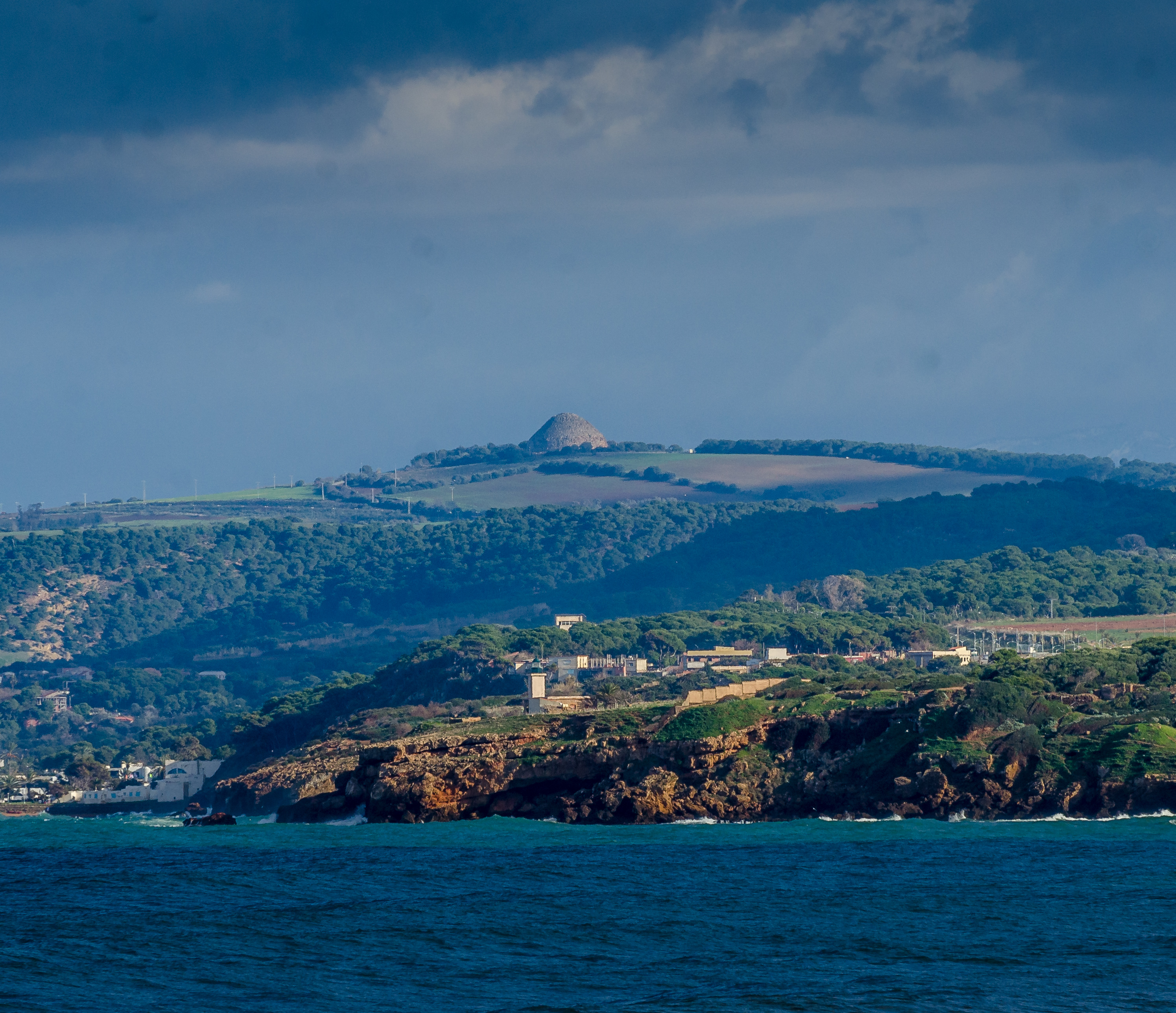
View of the Mausoleum from the sea

The sepulchre is sometimes known as the Mausoleum of Juba II and Cleopatra Selene. In French, it is called the Tombeau de la Chrétienne ("the tomb of the Christian woman") because there is a Christian cross-like shape of the division lines on the false door. In Arabic, the mausoleum is called the Kubr-er-Rumia or Kbor er Roumia, which means "tomb of the Christian woman", as Rûm was taken in Arabic as the Eastern Roman Empire and, in North Africa, rumi took the meaning "Christian". It may have been a deformation of a Punic phrase for "the royal tomb".

=== Royal Family of Mauretania ===
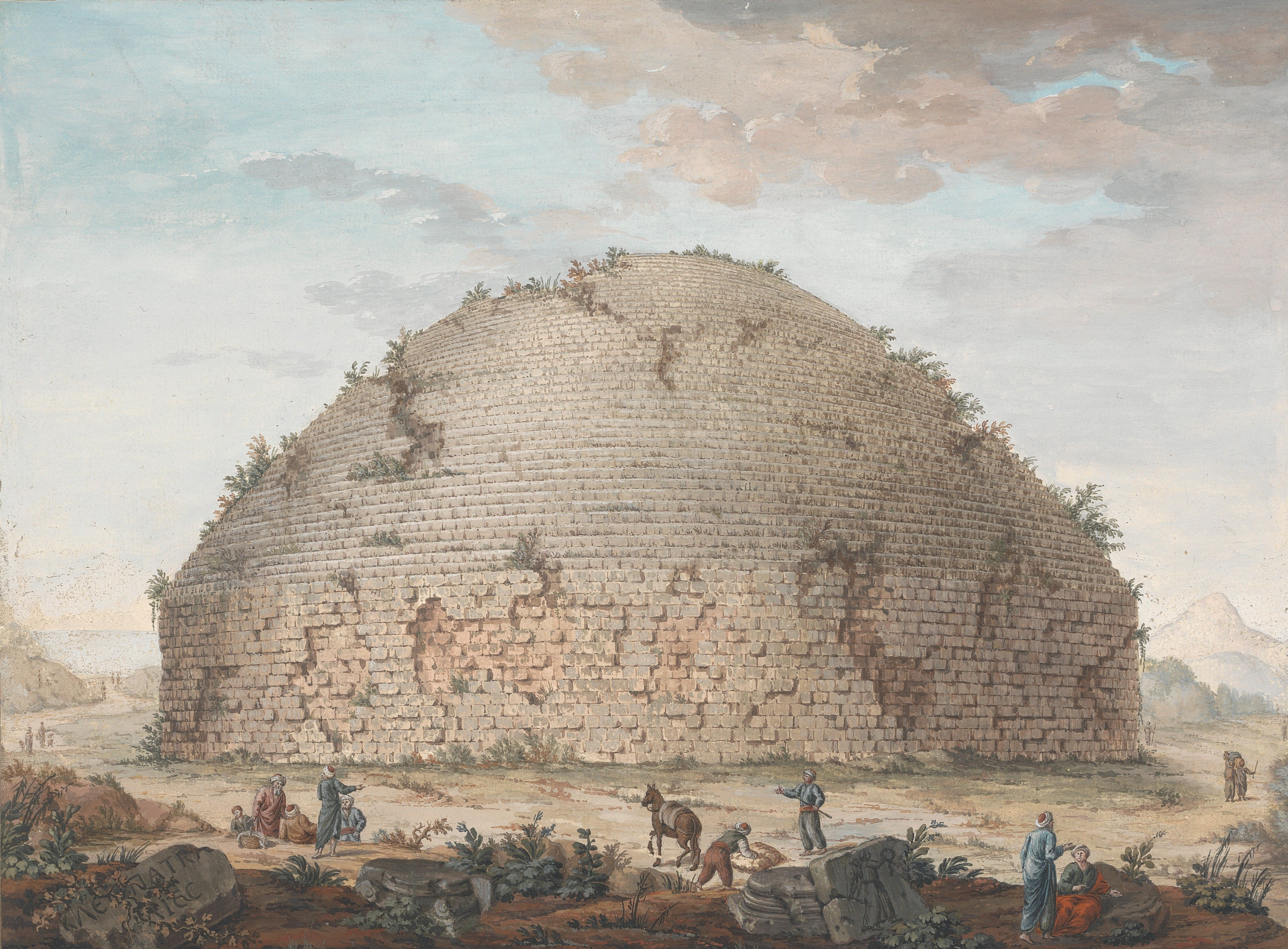
The mausoleum in 1769

The mausoleum was built in 3 BC by the King of Mauretania, Juba II (son of Juba I of Numidia) and his wife Cleopatra Selene II. She was a Greek Ptolemaic princess, the daughter of the Queen Cleopatra VII of Egypt and Roman Triumvir Mark Antony. Through her marriage to Juba II, she became Queen of Mauretania.

The mausoleum is probably the Royal Tomb that the 1st-century Roman geographer Pomponius Mela (1.31) described as the monumentum commune regiae gentis ("the communal mausoleum of the royal family"). If the geographer’s description of the mausoleum is correct, then the building was not intended just for Juba and Cleopatra, but envisaged as a dynastic funeral monument for their royal descendants.

The Mauretanian sepulchre looks similar to the Mausoleum of Augustus erected by the first Roman Emperor Augustus in Ancient Rome. Augustus began constructing his mausoleum between 29 BC-27 BC, some time before Juba II left Rome to return to Numidia.

=== Under the Ottomans and French ===
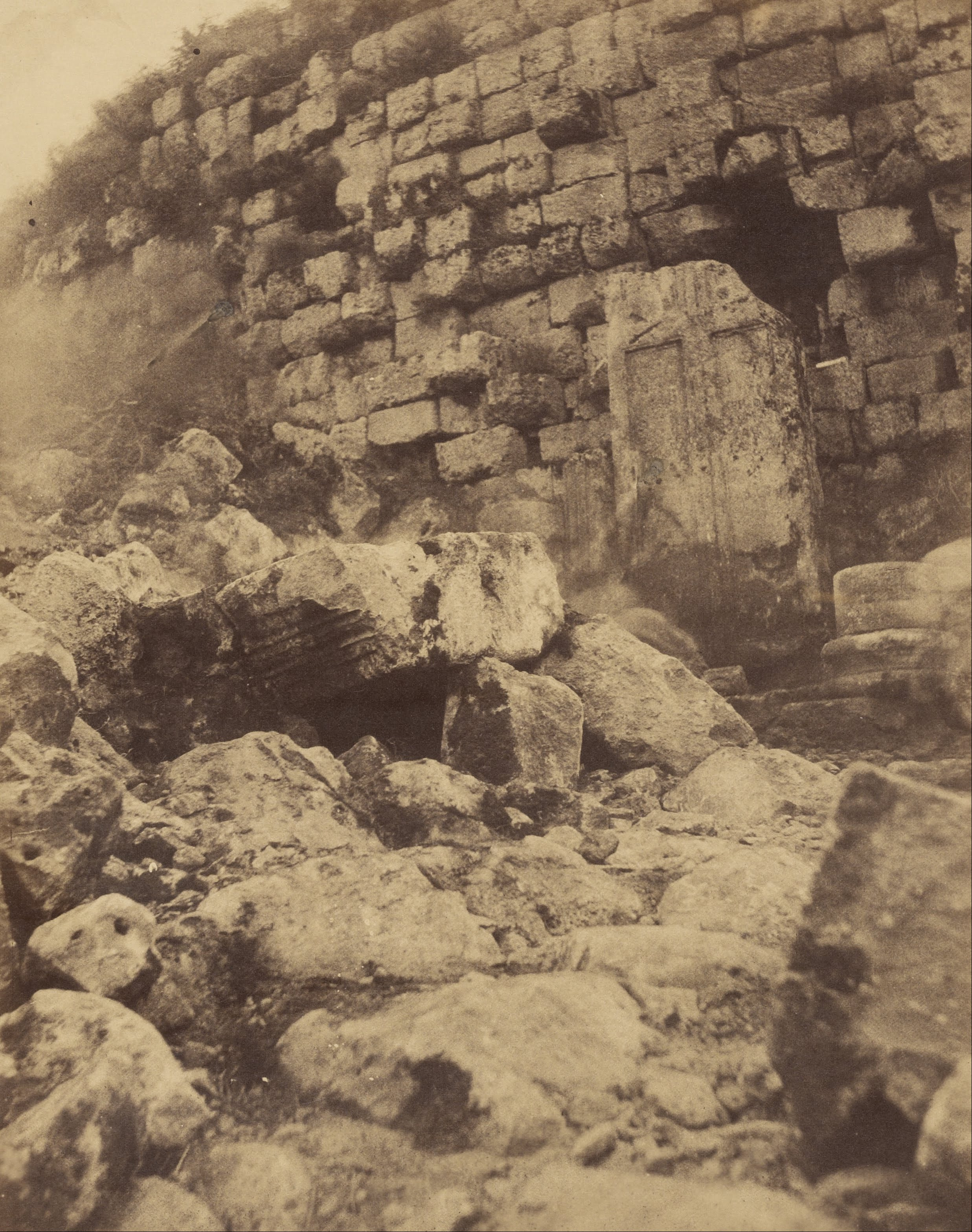
1856 photo by John Beasley Greene

In the 16th century, the mausoleum was believed by some Spaniards to be the tomb of Florinda la Cava, the legendary Berber woman from Ceuta, whose rape led to the Islamic conquest of Iberia. It has been explained as a confusion of Qabr Arrumiyya ("Christian tomb", locally qbér érromiya) and qàhba romiya ("Christian whore").

In 1555, the Pasha of Algiers, Salah Rais, gave orders to pull down the mausoleum. After large black Wasps swarmed out and stung some of the workers to death, the effort was abandoned. At the end of the 18th century, Baba Mahommed tried in vain to destroy the monument with artillery.

Following the French occupation of Algeria, the monument was used by the French Navy for target practice.

=== Recognition and conservation of the Mausoleum ===
The human remains of Juba II and Cleopatra Selene have not been found at the site. This is perhaps due to a grave robbery that occurred at an uncertain time (possibly shortly after the Mausoleum's construction). It is also possible that the structure was simply meant to serve as a memorial and not an actual place of burial.

The Royal Mausoleum of Mauretania is a part of a unique archaeological site along the road from Cherchell to Tipaza. On this archeological site, there are various monuments and infrastructure that have survived from the Phoenician (see also Carthage National Museum), Roman, Early Christianity and Byzantine periods. This group of ruins that are located along the Mediterranean Sea were recognized and inscribed on the UNESCO World Heritage Site in 1982.

Although these archaeological remains, including the Royal Mausoleum of Mauretania, are protected, the ruins located between Cherchell and Tipaza face constant threats from continual urban construction and expansion, open sewage drainage run offs, poor maintenance, and constant vandalism. Due to these ongoing problems, these archaeological remains face an uncertain future.

The local authorities have failed and had problems implementing a 1992 ‘Permanent Safeguarding and Presentation Plan’, an effective management program in preserving these ruins. In 2001, the World Heritage Site provided emergency assistance for this archaeological site. In 2002, experts from UNESCO visited the site and to report on the condition of the ruins; the archeological site has been placed on the List of World Heritage Sites in Danger.

== See also ==
- Berber mythology
- Madghacen
- Tin Hinan Tomb
- List of cultural assets of Algeria

== Sources ==
- Duane R. Roller, The World of Juba II and Kleopatra Selene: Royal Scholarship on Rome's African Frontier. New York and London: Routledge, 2003
- Juba II & Cleopatra Selene
- Page at UNESCO website
- Algeria: Archeological Finds Reveal a Varied Past
