= Antonius Musa =

Greek botanist and physician to Emperor Augustus

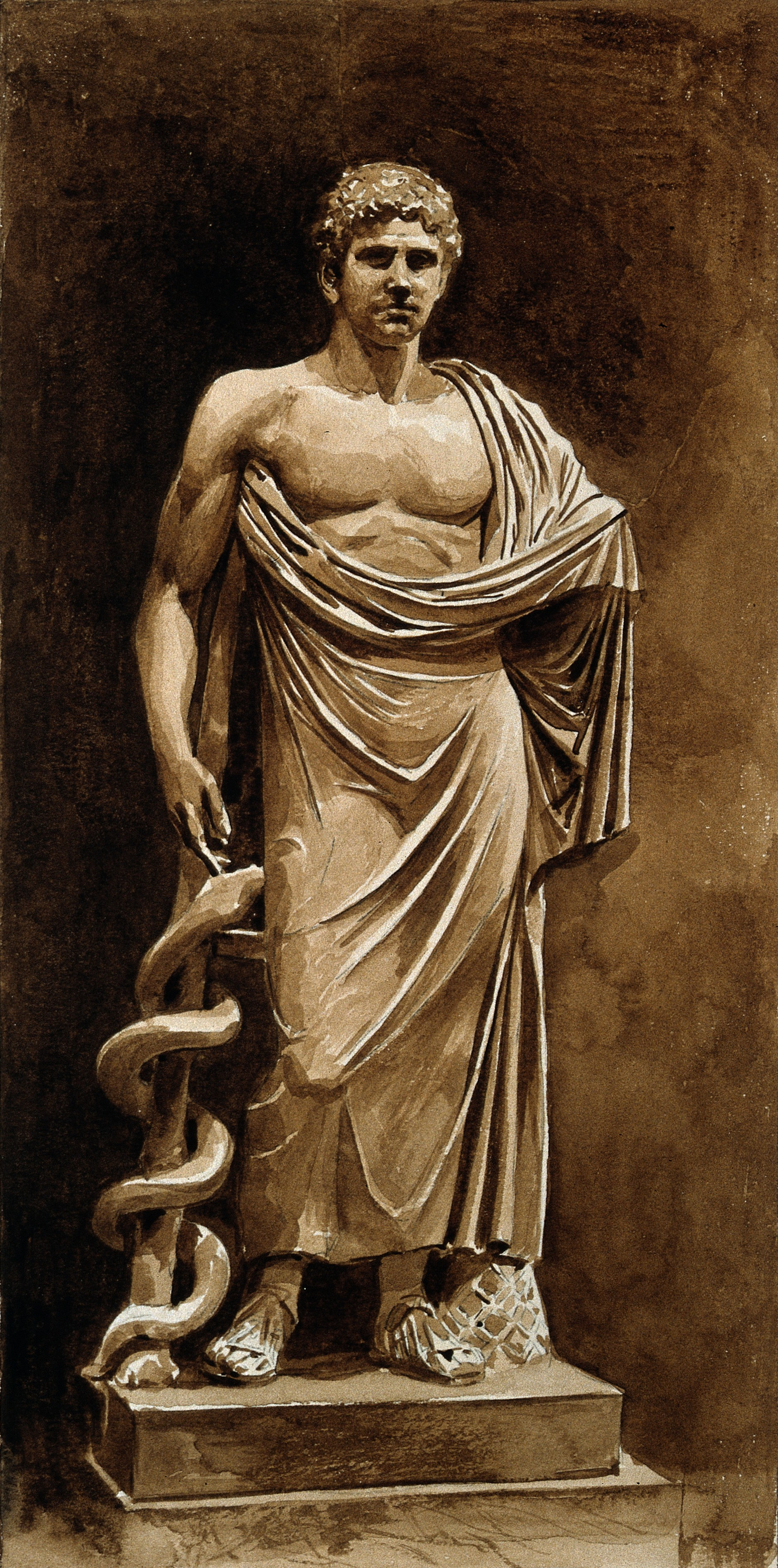
Antonius Musa

Antonius Musa (Ancient Greek: Ἀντώνιος Μούσας, Antṓnios Moúsas) was a Greek botanist and personal physician of the Roman Emperor Augustus. Antonius was a freedman who received freeborn status along with other honours. In the year 23 BC, when Augustus was seriously ill, Musa cured the illness with cold compresses and became immediately famous.

== Physician of Augustus ==
Antonius Musa was a freedman who most likely hailed from one of the Hellenized Greek areas in the eastern half of the Roman Empire. In the spring of 23 BC, when Augustus became seriously ill with liver problems during his consulship with Calpurnius Piso, Musa was tasked with treating the emperor. Musa reversed the typical medical treatment of warm compresses, favoring cold ones instead, which seems to have cured the emperor's ailments. After recovering from his illness, Augustus rewarded Musa with a generous sum of money. The Roman Senate voted to honor Musa with additional monetary rewards plus the right to wear a golden ring. He and other medical doctors were also granted exemption from taxation, while a statue of him was erected next to one depicting Asclepius, the god of healing. Various individuals also offered public thanks to Musa for his efforts.

== Legacy ==
Musa, the plant group which includes the banana, the plantain and numerous other species, was apparently named after him. However, Musa may be a Latinization of the Arabic name for the fruit, mauz (موز). Mauz meaning Musa is discussed in the 11th century Arabic encyclopedia The Canon of Medicine, which was translated to Latin in medieval times and well known in Europe.

Musa's brother was Euphorbus, physician to king Juba II of Numidia, after whom the plant Euphorbia, which has given its name to a scientific genus, was originally named.

A short medical treatise called De Herba Vettonica describing the properties of betony has been transmitted under his name, but is thought instead to have been written in the 4th century. It seems to have been a source for the Roman medical writer Theodorus Priscianus.

According to Francis Atterbury, the character Iapis in Virgil's Aeneid represents Musa while Aeneas represents Augustus.
