= Juba II =

King of Numidia and Mauretania (c. 48 BC - AD 23)

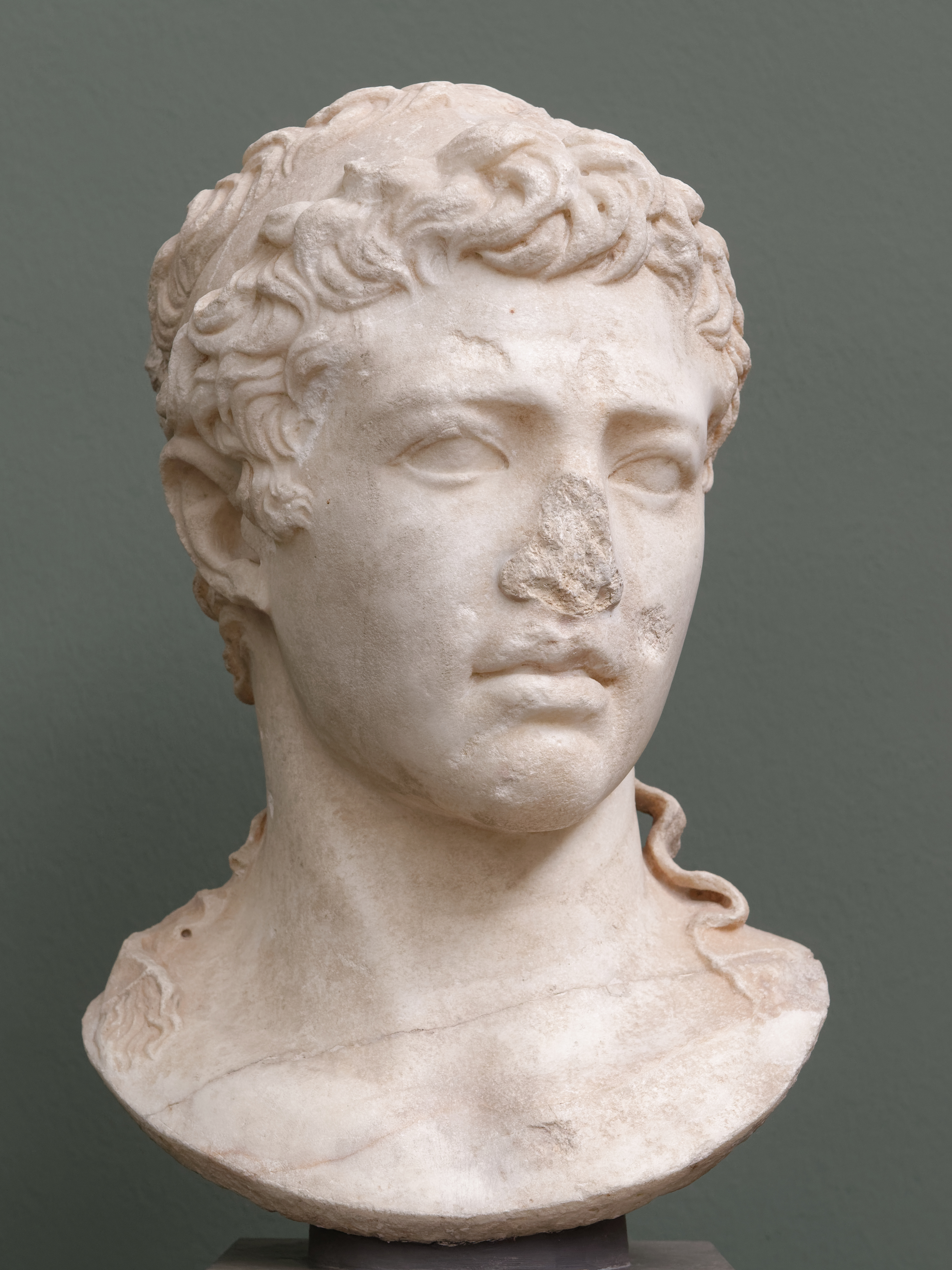
- Portrait bust of Juba II, Ny Carlsberg Glyptotek

King of Numidia
- Reign: 30 BC – 25 BC (5 years)
- Predecessor: Juba I (in the east); Arabio (in the west)
- Successor: Annexed to the Roman Republic/Empire

King of Mauretania
- Reign: 25 BC – AD 23 (47 years)
- Predecessor: Bocchus II
- Successor: Ptolemy
- Co-ruler: Cleopatra Selene II (until 5 BC); Ptolemy (from 20 AD)
- Born: Hippone, Annaba (Algeria)
- Died: 23 AD; Caesarea Mauretania (Algeria)
- Burial: Royal Mausoleum of Mauretania
- Spouse: Cleopatra Selene II; Glaphyra of Cappadocia
- Issue: Ptolemy of Mauretania; Unnamed daughter
Names
- Latin: Gaius Iulius Iuba
- Father: Juba I

Juba II of Mauretania (Latin: Gaius Iulius Iuba; Ancient Greek: Ἰóβας, Ἰóβα or Ἰούβας; c. 48 BC – AD 23) was the son of Juba I and client king of Numidia (30–25 BC) and Mauretania (25 BC – AD 23). His capital, Caesarea (modern-day Cherchell, Algeria), made his reign an important part of the ancient history of present-day Algeria. Aside from his very successful reign, he was a highly respected scholar and author. His first wife and co-ruler was Cleopatra Selene II, daughter of Queen Cleopatra VII of Ptolemaic Egypt and Roman Triumvir Mark Antony.

== Life ==
=== Early life and education ===
Juba II was an Amazigh prince from Numidia, born in Hippone (modern-day Annaba, Algeria). He was the only child and heir of King Juba I of Numidia; his mother's identity is unknown, though Juba II claimed to be a descendant of General Hannibal (Scol. Lucan, Pharsalia 8.287). In 46 BC, his father was defeated by Julius Caesar (in Thapsus, North Africa), and in 40 BC Numidia became a Roman province. His father had been an ally of the Roman General Pompey.

Several modern scholars cite his age at Caesar's triumph in 46 BC as four or six giving rises to the typically cited birth year range of 52–50 BC, which his biographer, Duane Roller, believes is incorrect. Roller instead places his birth in early 48 BC because the Greek term brephos was used for him which means infant. The word for a child of age 4 to 6 is pais which was not used for him in the ancient sources. Therefore, Roller places his age in the triumph at anywhere from 2 months to 2 years, which actually indicates a birth year range between 48 and 46 BC.

Juba II was brought to Rome by Julius Caesar and he took part in Caesar's triumphal procession. In Rome he learned the Latin and Greek, became romanized and was granted Roman citizenship. Through dedication to his studies, he is said to have become one of Rome's best educated citizens, and by age 20 he wrote one of his first works entitled Roman Archaeology.

He was raised by Julius Caesar and later by his great-nephew Octavian (future Emperor Augustus). While growing up, Juba II accompanied Octavian on military campaigns, gaining valuable experience as a leader. He fought alongside Octavian in the Battle of Actium in 31 BC.

=== Restoration to the Numidian throne ===
In 30 BC, Octavian restored Juba II as king of Numidia. Juba II established Numidia as an ally of Rome. Probably as a result of his services to Augustus in a campaign in Hispania, between 27 BC and 25 BC, the Emperor made the final decision to give him his kingship of Mauretania. His kingdom replaced the province of Africa Nova which included territories of both Eastern Numidia and Western Numidia. This kingdom of Numidia (except the territory of Western Numidia) was in 25 BC directly annexed to the Roman Empire as the part of the Roman province of Africa Proconsularis and Juba II received Mauretania as his kingdom, enlarged by territory of Western Numidia. The marriage of Juba II and Cleopatra Selene II likely took place in 25 BC, when Cleopatra Selene was of proper age and Juba II was sent to rule Mauretania.

=== Reign in Mauretania ===
According to Strabo, upon the death of the Mauretanian king Bocchus II, who was an ally of the Romans, his kingdom was briefly governed directly by Rome (33 BC - 25 BC), then in 25 BC Juba II received it from Augustus. When Juba II and Cleopatra Selene moved to Mauretania, they named their new capital Caesaria (modern Cherchell, Algeria), in honour of Augustus. The construction and sculpture projects at Caesaria and another city, Volubilis, display a rich mixture of Egyptian, Greek and Roman architectural styles.

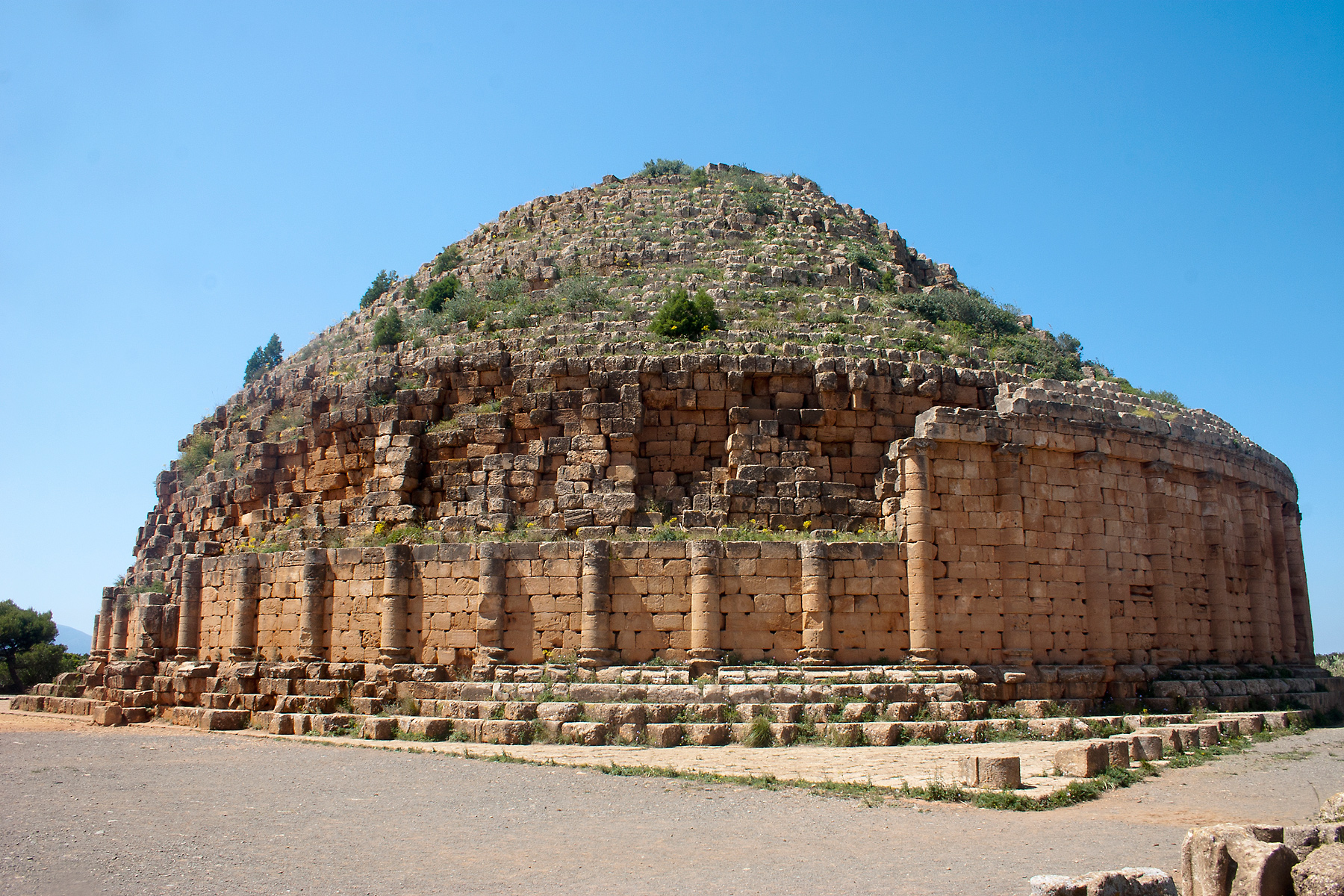
The tomb of Juba II and his wife in Tipaza, Algeria

Cleopatra is said to have exerted considerable influence on Juba II's policies. Juba II encouraged and supported the performing arts, research of the sciences and research of natural history. Juba II also supported Mauretanian trade. The Kingdom of Mauretania was of great importance to the Roman Empire. Mauretania engaged in trade all across the Mediterranean, particularly with Spain and Italy. Mauretania exported fish, grapes, pearls, figs, grain, wooden furniture and purple dye harvested from certain shellfish, which was used in the manufacture of purple stripes for senatorial robes. Juba II sent a contingent to Iles Purpuraires to re-establish the ancient Phoenician dye manufacturing process. Tingis (modern Tangier), a town at the Pillars of Hercules (modern Strait of Gibraltar) became a major trade centre. In Gades, (modern Cádiz) and Carthago Nova (modern Cartagena) in Spain, Juba II was appointed by Augustus as an honorary Duovir (a chief magistrate of a Roman colony or town).

The value and quality of the Mauretanian coinage became highly regarded. The Greek historian Plutarch describes him as 'one of the most gifted rulers of his time'. Between 2 BC and AD 2, he travelled with Gaius Caesar (a grandson of Augustus), as an advisor to the Eastern Mediterranean. In AD 21, Juba II made his son Ptolemy his co-ruler.

Juba II died in AD 23. Juba II was buried alongside his first wife in the Royal Mausoleum of Mauretania. Ptolemy then became the sole ruler of Mauretania.

== Marriages and children ==
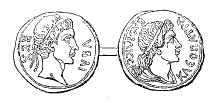
Illustration of a coin of the Numidian ruler Juba II, king of Mauretania, on the obverse, with Cleopatra Selene II on the reverse.

Juba married two times.

- First marriage was to Greek Ptolemaic princess Cleopatra Selene II (40 BC – 5 BC).
- Second marriage was to Glaphyra, a princess of Cappadocia, and widow of Alexander, son of Herod the Great. Alexander was executed in 7 BC for his involvement in a conspiracy against his father. Glaphyra married Juba II in 6 AD or 7 AD. She then fell in love with Herod Archelaus, another son of Herod the Great and Ethnarch of Judea. Glaphyra divorced Juba to marry him in 7 AD.

He had two children:

- Ptolemy of Mauretania born in ca. 10/5 BC, by Selene.
- A daughter, mentioned in Athenian inscription, probably also by Selene. She is sometimes identified as Drusilla of Mauretania, however it is more likely that Drusilla was her niece.

== Works ==
=== Writings ===
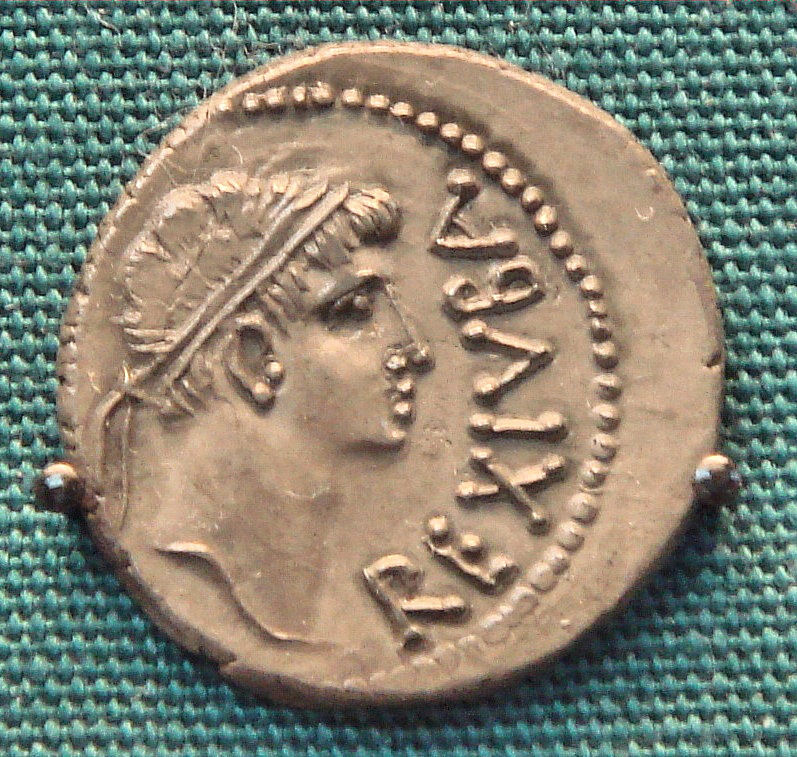
Coin of Juba II.

Juba wrote a number of books in Greek on history, natural history, geography, grammar, painting and theatre. He compiled a comparison of Greek and Roman institutions known as Όμοιότητες (Resemblances). His guide to Arabia became a bestseller in Rome. Only fragments of his works survive. He collected a substantial library on a wide variety of topics, which no doubt complemented his own prolific output. Pliny the Elder refers to him as an authority 65 times in the Natural History and in Athens, a monument was built in the Gymnasium of Ptolemy in recognition of his writings.

Ten works by Juba II have provisionally been identified, but all are fragmentary:

- Roman Archaeology, in two books
- Resemblances, in at least fifteen books
- On Painting, in at least eight books
- Theatrical History, in at least seventeen books
- The Wanderings of Hanno, possibly a translation of the periplus of Hanno the Navigator
- On Euphorbion, a pamphlet
- Libyka, in at least three books
- On Arabia, which is the only work by Juba that may have been in Latin
- On Assyria, in two books
- Epigrams, of which six lines of one quoted by Athenaeus are all that survives

Juba's works survive only in quotations or citations by others, in both Greek and Latin. There are around 100 of these, about half in Pliny the Elder's Natural History. Others can be found in Athenaeus, Plutarch, Claudius Aelianus Harpokration, Dioscórides, Galen, Philostratus, Herodian, Tatian, Ammianus Marcellinus, Solinus, Hesychius of Miletus, Stephanos of Byzantium, Photios, the Etymologicum Magnum, the Geoponica and various scholia on classical authors.

Juba may have written plays, but these are not quoted, and no titles are known. The supposition relies on a reading of a passage in Athenaeus. There are two late citations to Juba that seem to be spurious. Photios cites the otherwise unknown On the Deterioration of Words, while Fulgentius cites a certain Fisiologia. Both may have been epitomes of Juba's authentic works.

A treaty on metrics was formerly ascribed to him, but is now generally thought to have been written by an homonym.

=== Patron of arts and sciences ===
Juba II was a noted patron of the arts and sciences and sponsored several expeditions and biological research. According to Pliny the Younger, Juba II sent an expedition to the Canary Islands and Madeira. He named them the Canary Islands for the particularly ferocious dogs (canarius – from canis – meaning of the dogs in Latin) the expedition found there.

Flavius Philostratus recalled one of his anecdotes: "And I have read in the discourse of Juba that elephants assist one another when they are being hunted, and that they will defend one that is exhausted, and if they can remove him out of danger, they anoint his wounds with the tears of the aloe tree, standing round him like physicians."

Juba's Greek physician Euphorbus wrote that a succulent spurge found in the High Atlas was a powerful laxative. In 12 BC, Juba named this plant Euphorbia after Euphorbus, in response to Augustus dedicating a statue to Antonius Musa, Augustus's own personal physician and Euphorbus's brother. Botanist and taxonomist Carl Linnaeus assigned the name Euphorbia to the entire genus in the physician's honour. Euphorbia was later called Euphorbia regis-jubae ("King Juba's euphorbia") to honour the king's contributions to natural history and his role in bringing the genus to notice. The palm tree genus Jubaea is also named after Juba.

The following plant genera, species and varieties have been named after Juba:

- Callitriche regis-jubae - an aquatic plant from the western Mediterranean.
- Euphorbia ×jubaeaphylla - a named hybrid between two Euphorbia species on Tenerife, Canary Islands.
- Euphorbia regis-jubae - another spurge from the Canary Islands and Western Sahara
- Jubaea - a native palm from Chile, with one species.
- Jubaeopsis - a native palm from South Africa, with one species.
- ×Jubautia - a hybrid reported in cultivation between Jubaea chilensis and Butia capitata.
- Parajubaea - a genus of palm trees from Bolivia, Colombia, Ecuador and Peru.
- Phoenix dactylifera var. jubae - a variety of palm from the Canary Islands, now known as P. canariensis.
- Sonchus regis-jubae - a sow thistle from La Gomera, Canary Islands.

== Gallery ==
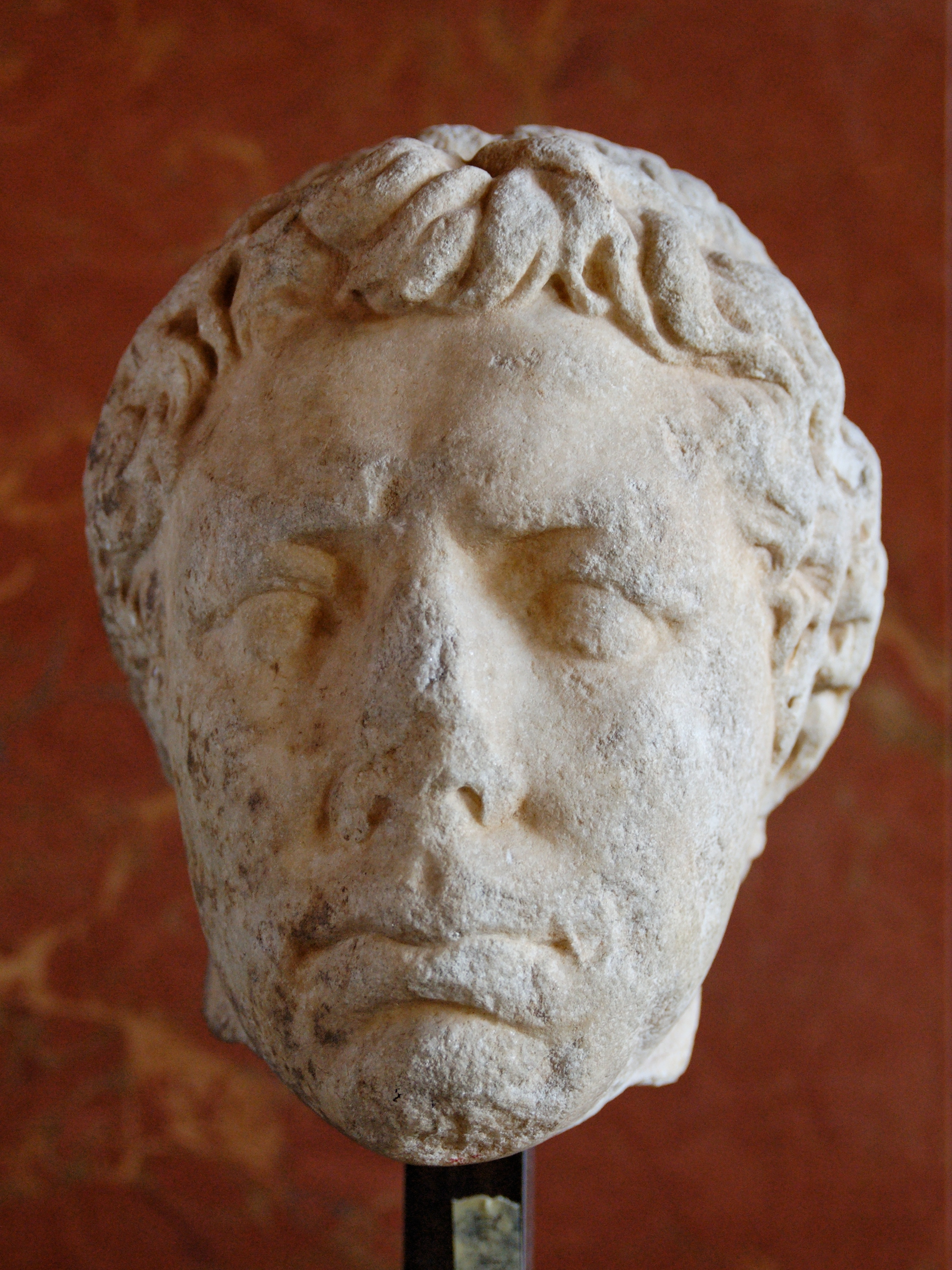
Marble portrait of Juba II housed in the Louvre.

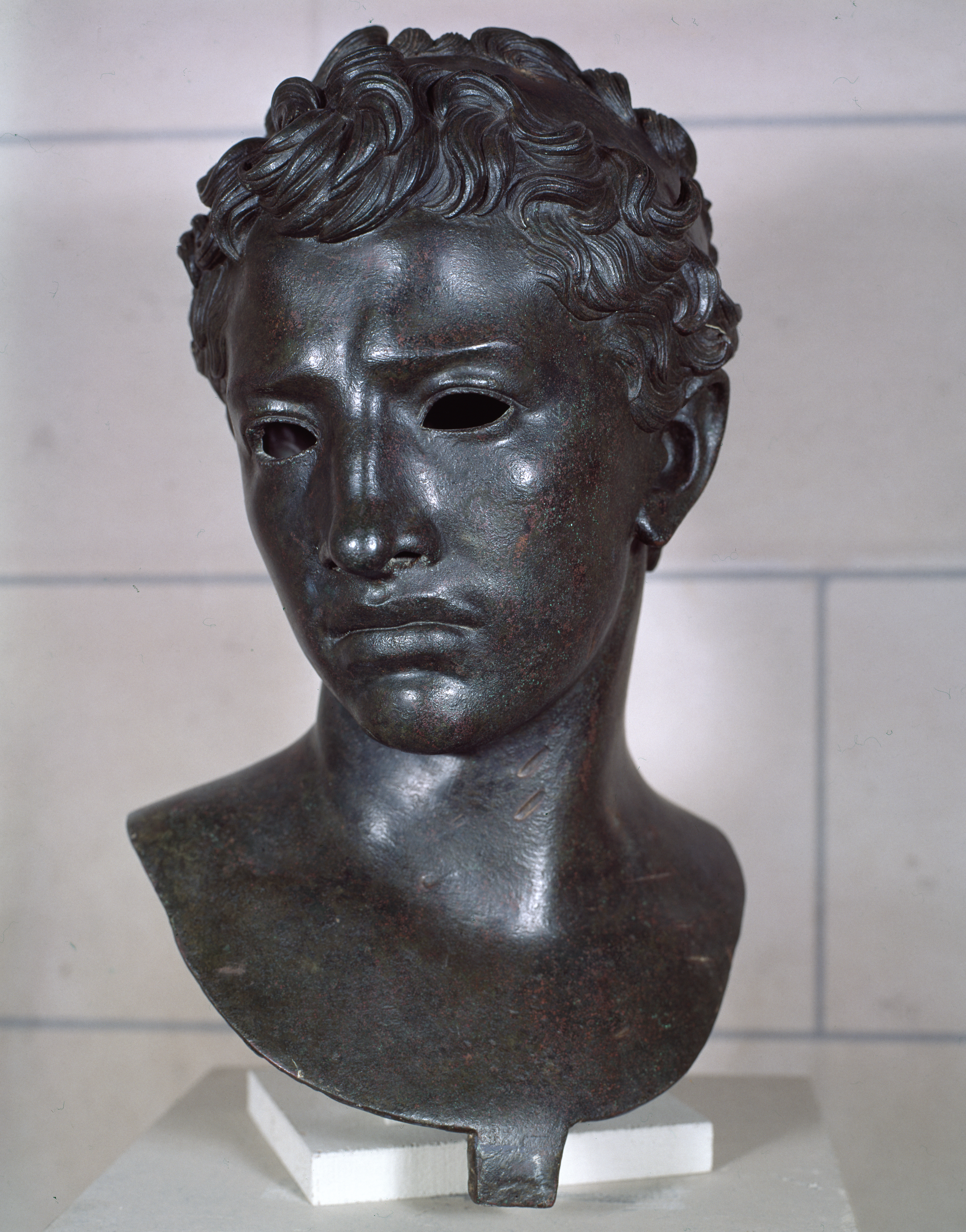
Bust of Juba II in the Museum of History and Civilizations from the 0020s BC.

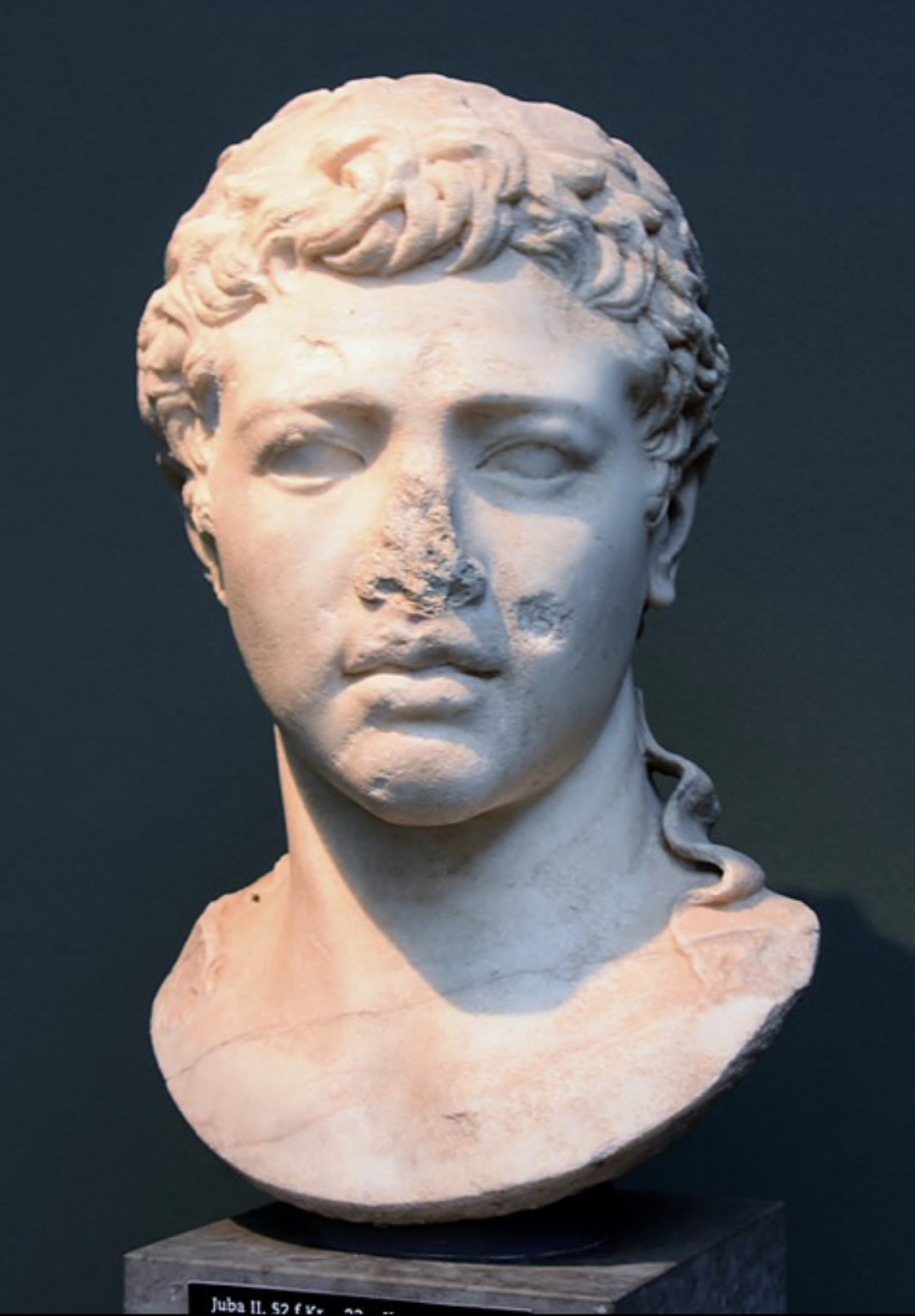
Bust of Juba II in the Ny Carlsberg Glyptotek, dating to the 1st century AD.

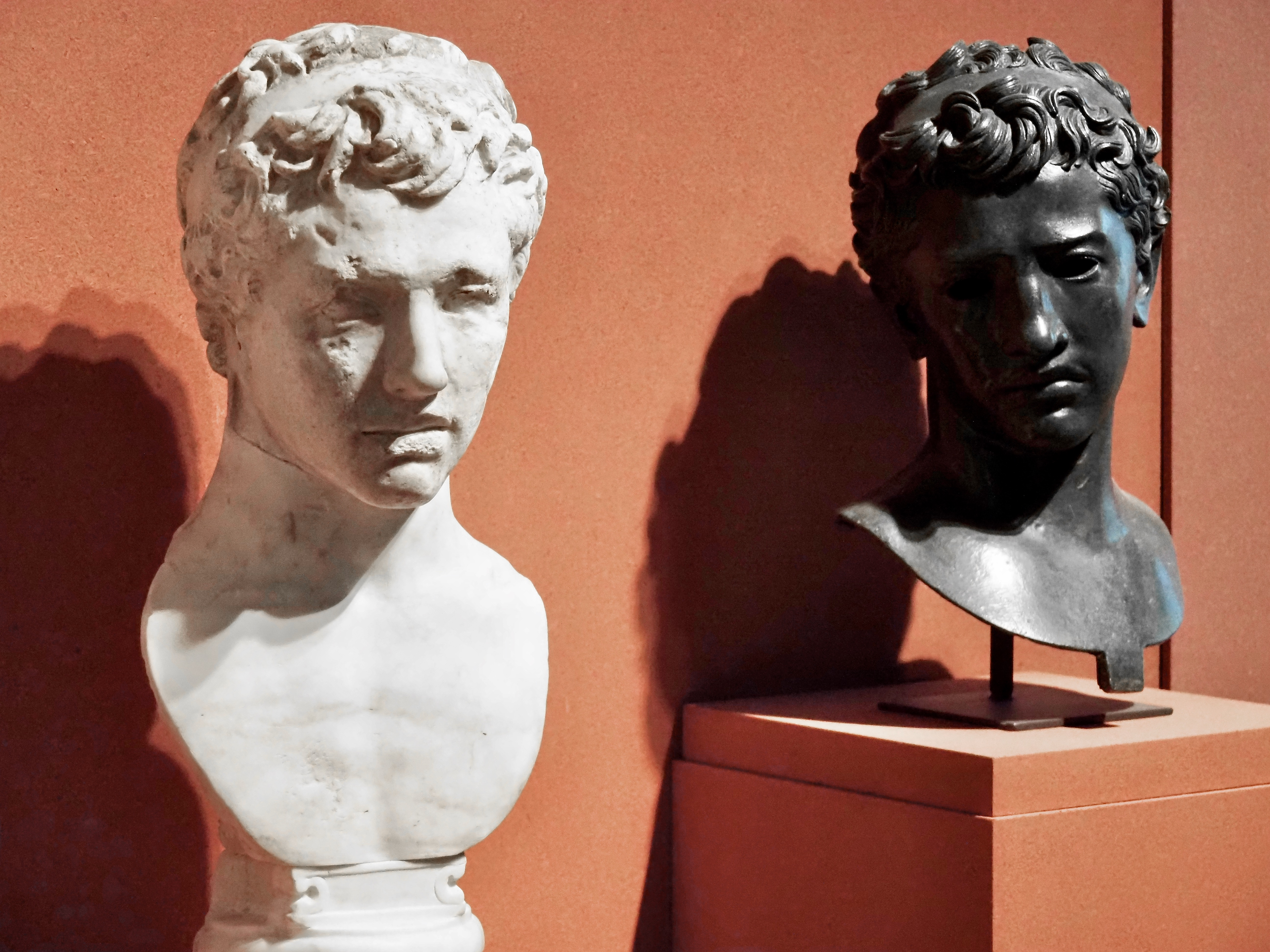
Busts of Juba II in a temporary exhibit at the National Archaeological Museum of Spain. The marble bust on the right dates to around 10 AD, while bronze bust on the right dates to circa 25 BC.

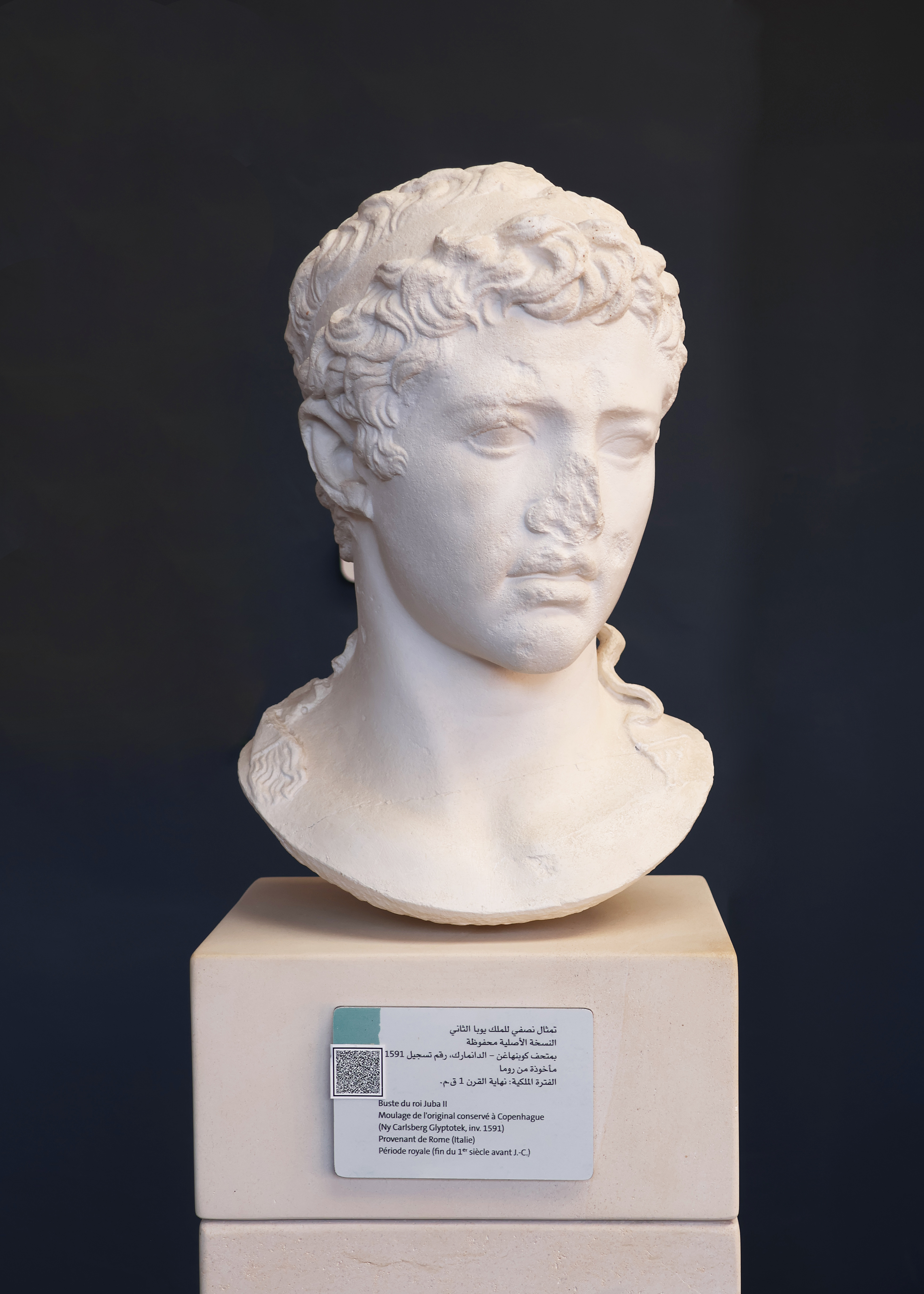
Bust of Juba II made in Rome during the late 1st century BC, housed in the Archaeological Museum of Cherchell.
