= Medracen =

Ancient mausoleum in Algeria

Madracen
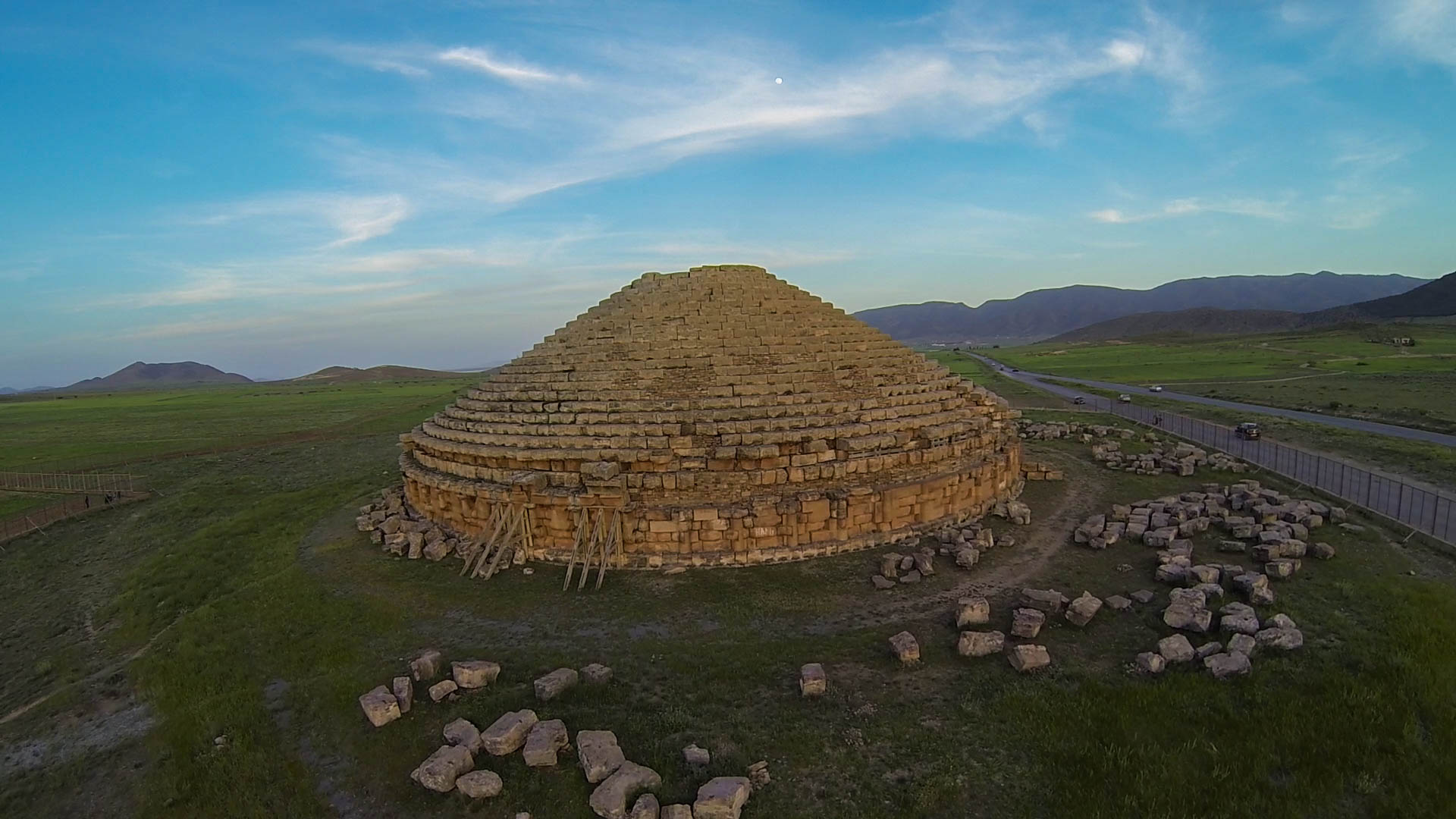

- Location within Algeria
- 35°42′26″N 6°26′05″E
- Location: Batna Province, Algeria
- Region: Numidia

Medracen, also spelled Madghacen, is an ancient funerary monument located near Batna in Algeria. It has been identified as a royal mausoleum built by the Berber Numidian Kingdom.

== History ==
Medracen is one of several large funerary monuments from the era of ancient Berber kingdoms in Classical antiquity. It is one of two that were built in the shape of a tumulus; the other being the so-called "Tomb of the Christian Woman" or Royal Mausoleum of Mauretania. Medracen is the oldest of these and has been dated to fourth century BC or to the time of the Numidian king Masinissa (r. 202 – 148 BC), around the end of the third century BC and first half of the second century BC.

== Architecture ==
The mausoleum consists of a large tumulus constructed in well-cut ashlar masonry and featuring sixty Doric columns and an Egyptian-style cornice.

Though independent, the Numidian kingdom was increasingly involved in Mediterranean power politics, and an architect familiar with classical architecture surrounded the vertical section of wall at the base with engaged columns in the Doric order, "heavily proportioned and with smooth shafts, beneath a cavetto cornice". The whole exterior was covered with a stone facing, most of which remains, with the straight cone of the upper part (except for a flat top) formed into steps, like the Pyramids of Egypt.

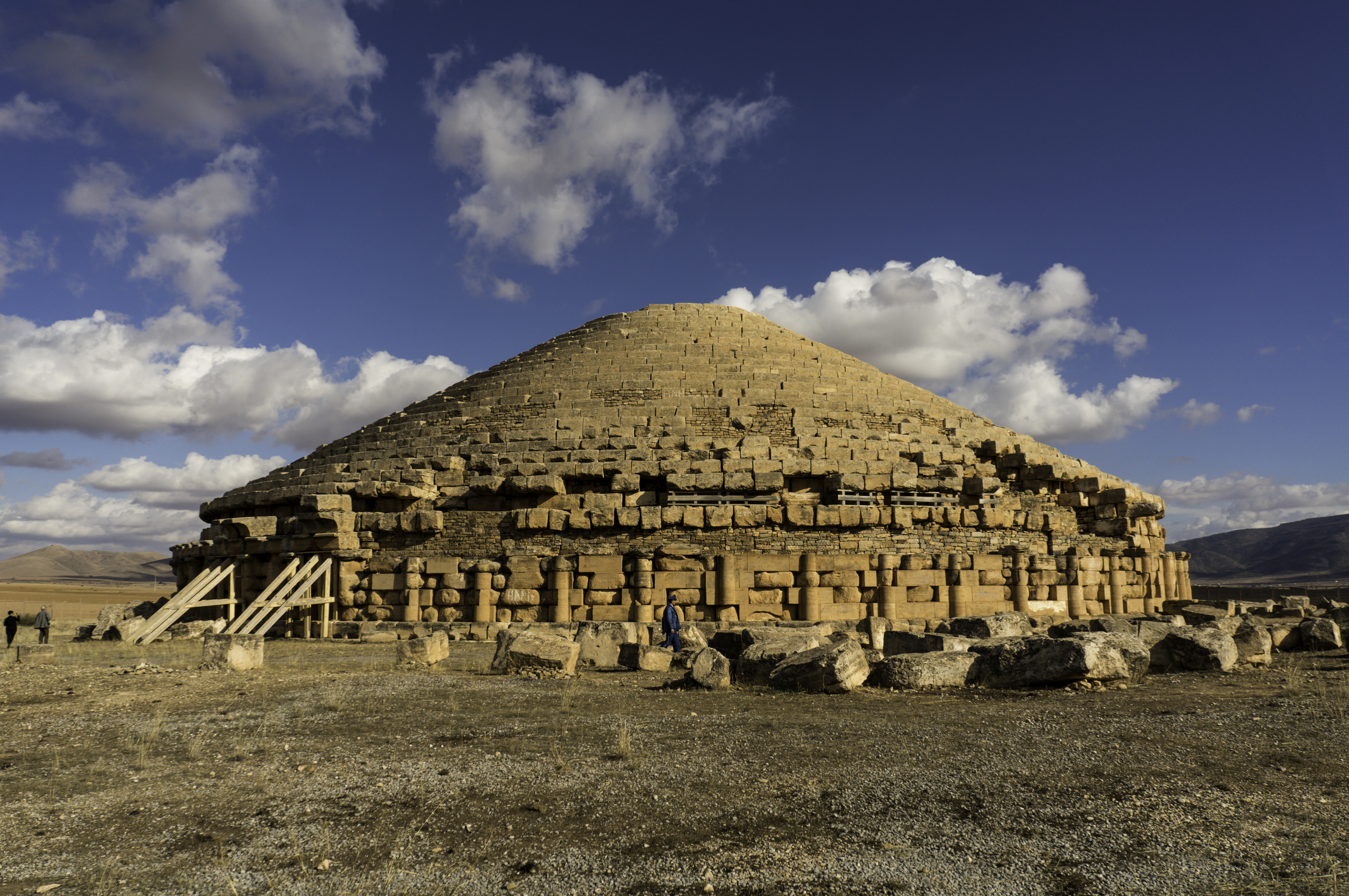
Profile view of the monument

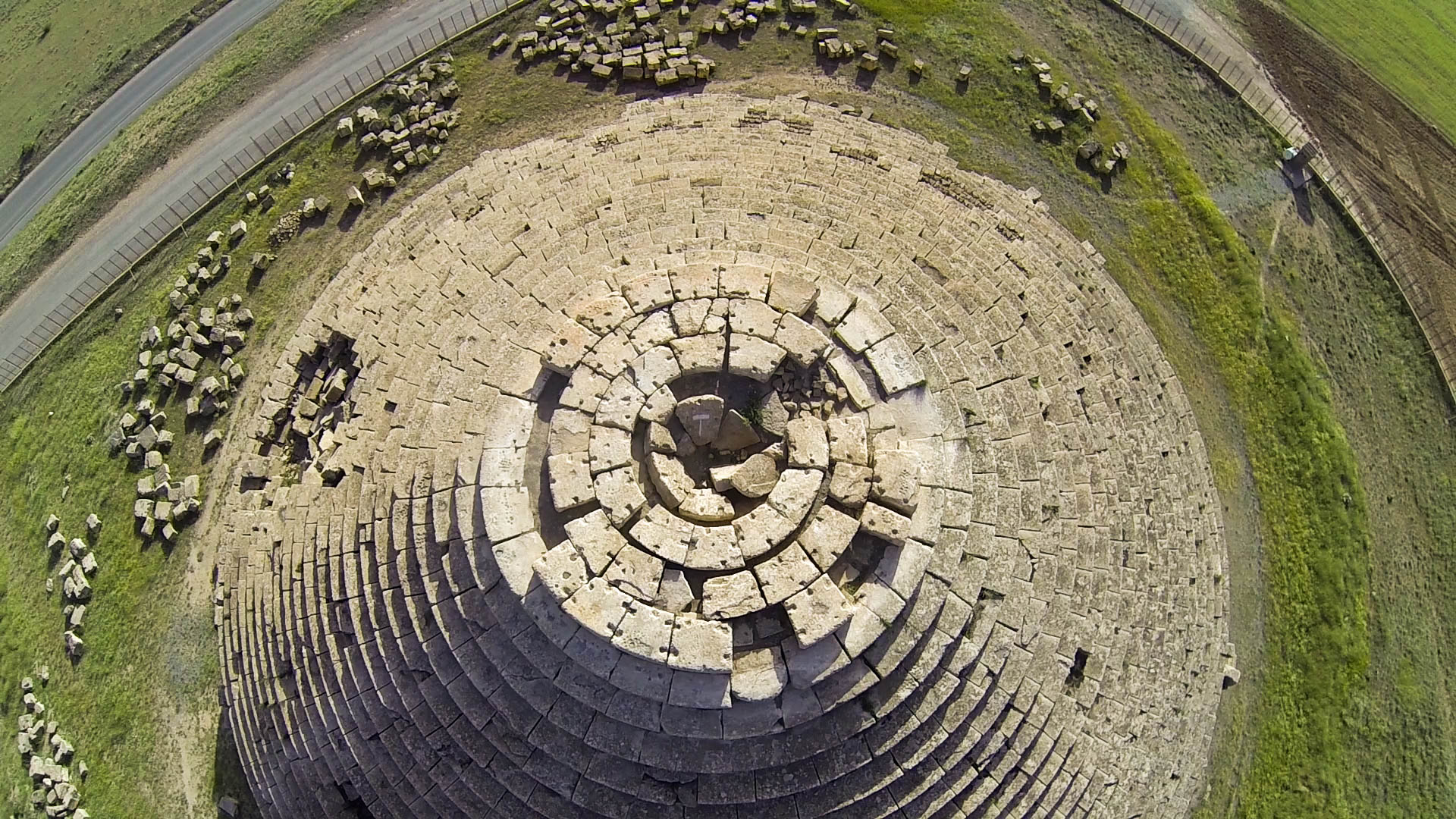
View from above, showing the stepped sides

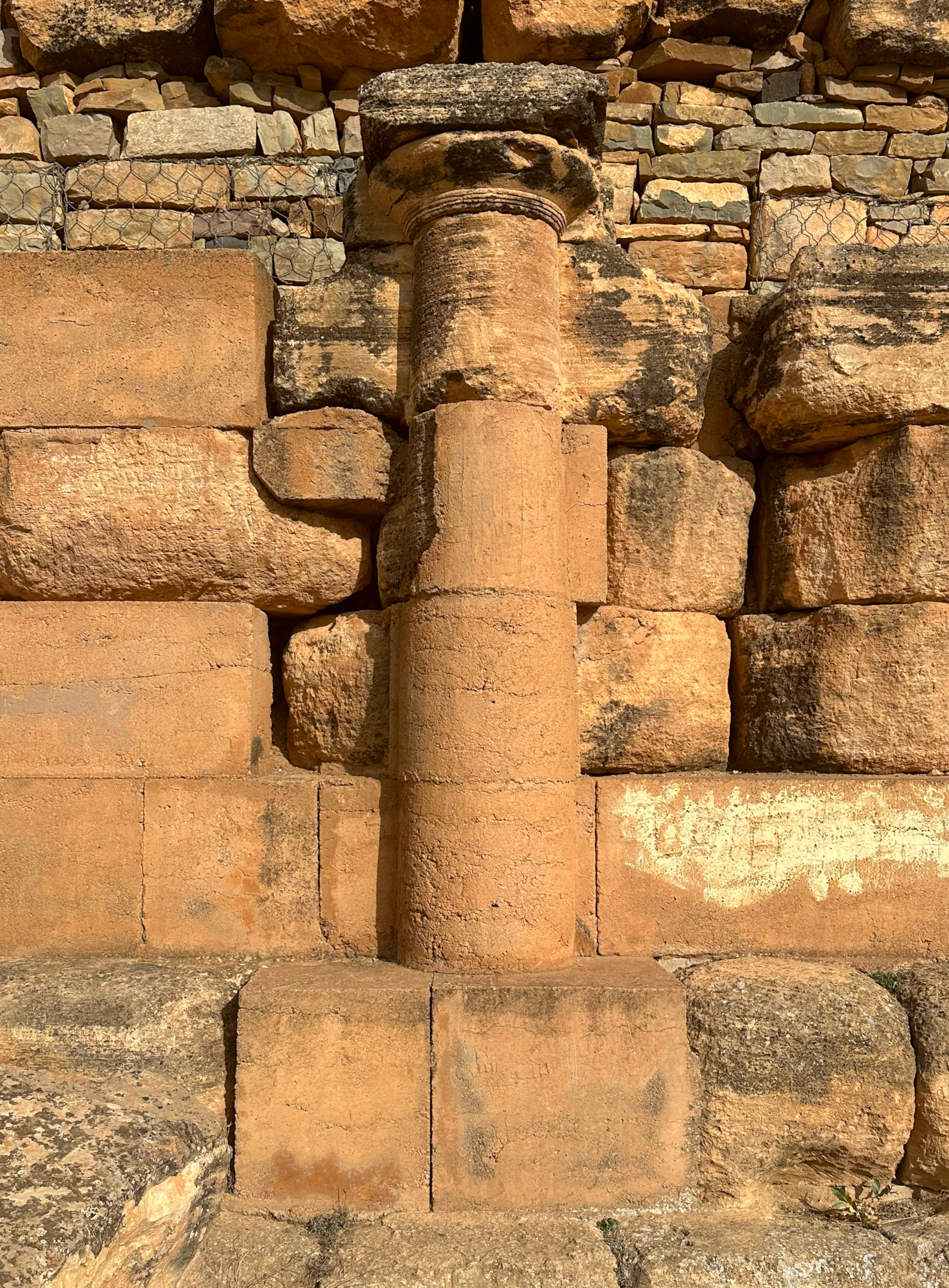
One of the Doric order columns

== Threats ==
As ICOMOS noted in their 2006/2007 Heritage at Risk report, the mausoleum has become "the victim of major 'repair work' without respect for the value of the monument and its authenticity."

== See also ==
- List of cultural assets of Algeria
