= Heliodorus (metrist) =

Heliodorus (Greek: Ἡλιόδωρος) was a metrist in the 1st century AD who worked upon the comedies of Aristophanes. He was the principal authority used by Juba.
