= Juba (Roman metrician) =

Juba was a writer who lived at the end of the 2nd century or in the 3rd century CE. He wrote a now-lost treatise on metric, based on Heliodorus and used by later grammarians. He was previously identified with Juba II, the king of Mauretania, but this interpretation is now rejected on chronological ground.
