= Euphorbus (physician) =

Greek physician to Mauretanian king Juba II

Euphorbus (Ancient Greek: Εὔφορβος Euphorbos) was the Greek physician of Juba II (r. 30 BC – 25 BC). He wrote that a succulent plant, similar to the Euphorbia, was a powerful laxative. In 12 BC, Juba named this plant after his physician Euphorbus in response to Augustus dedicating a statue to Antonius Musa, Augustus's own personal physician and Euphorbus' brother.

Botanist and taxonomist Carl Linnaeus assigned the name Euphorbia to the entire genus in the physician's honour.
