= Convent of San Francisco =

Convent of San Francisco may refer to:

- Basilica and Convent of San Francisco in Lima, Peru
- Basilica and Convent of San Francisco in Quito, Ecuador
- Convent of San Francisco in Mexico City, Mexico
- Palace of the Convent of San Francisco in Granada, Spain
- Convento de San Francisco de Asis, in Havana, Cuba
