= Palace of the Convent of San Francisco =

Historic building inside the Alhambra of Granada, Spain

- Palacio del Convento de San Francisco
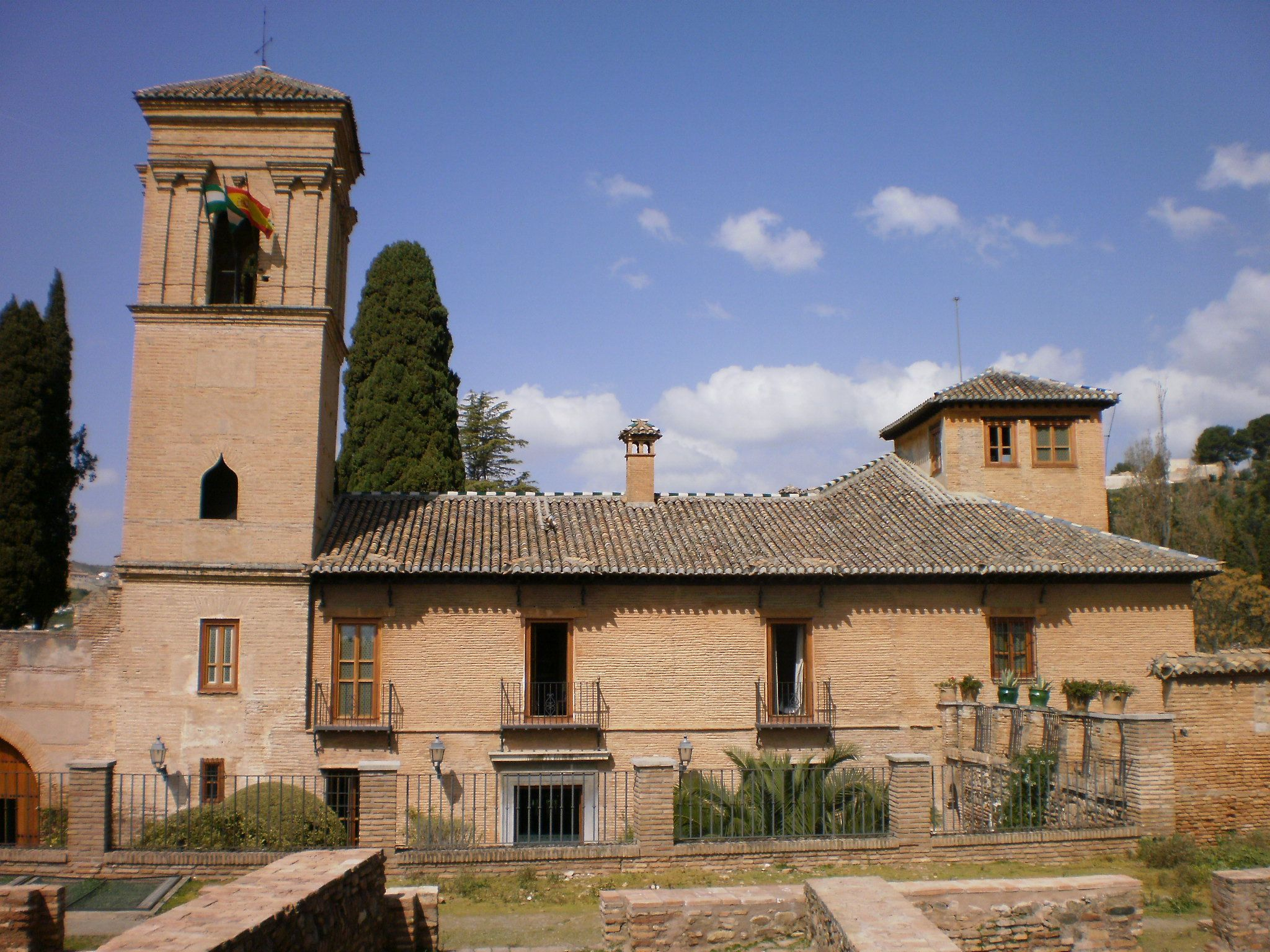
- Interactive map of the Palace of the Convent of San Francisco area
- Alternative names: Parador de Granada
- Hotel chain: Paradores

General information
- Status: Used as hotel
- Type: Palace, convent
- Architectural style: Baroque, with older Moorish remains
- Location: Granada, Spain
- Coordinates: 37°10′33″N 3°35′13.7″W

Website
- Parador de Granada

The Palace of the Convent of San Francisco (Spanish: Palacio del Convento de San Francisco) or Palace of the ex-Convent of San Francisco (Spanish: Palacio del Exconvento de San Francisco) is a former medieval Nasrid palace in the Alhambra of Granada, Spain, which was transformed into a Franciscan convent after the Spanish conquest of Granada. By the early 20th century it had fallen into ruins and it was significantly restored under the direction of Leopoldo Torres Balbás in the 1920s. Since 1945, it serves as a state-owned Parador hotel.

== History ==
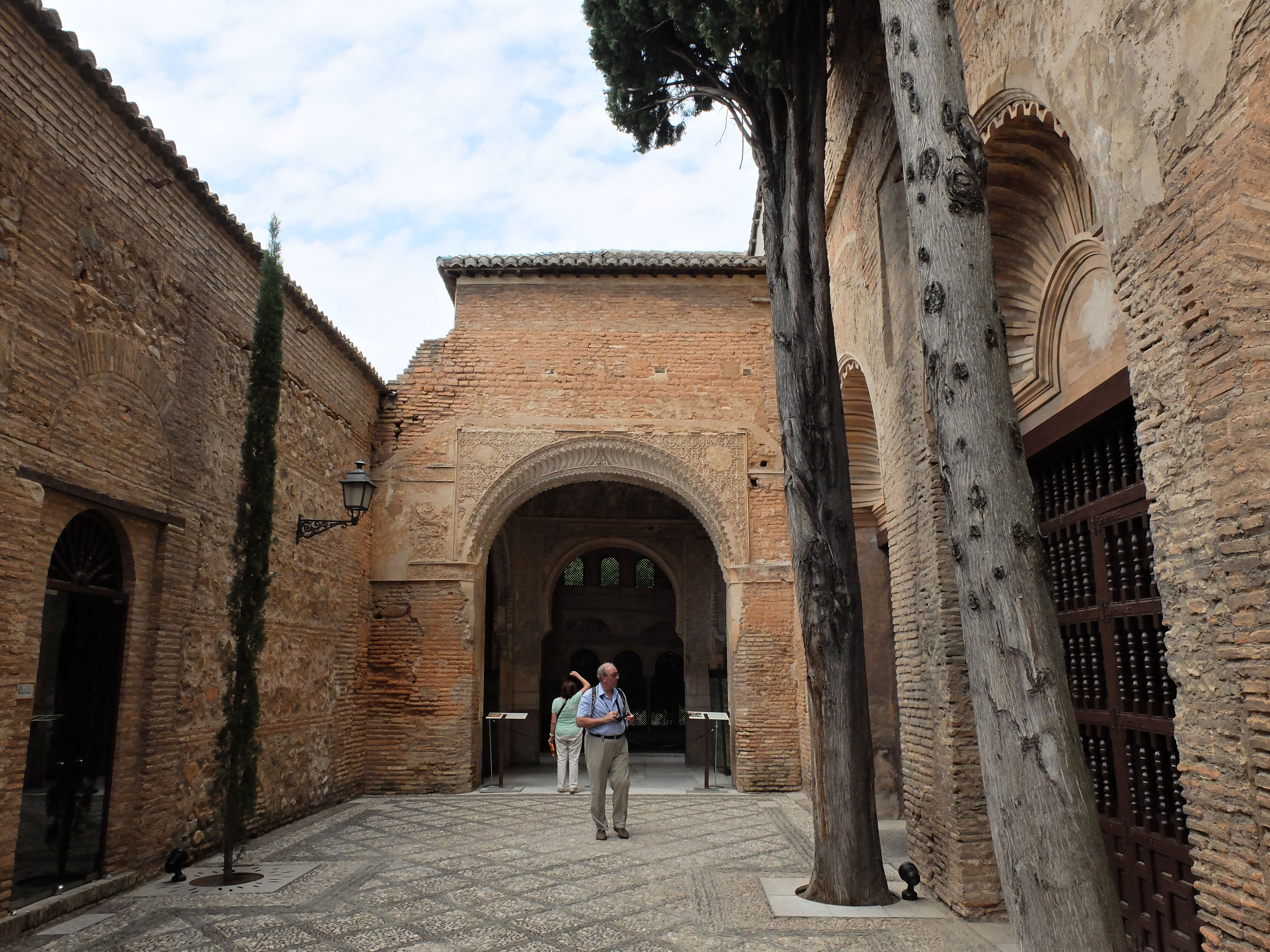
Remains of the convent's church today, looking towards the Nasrid-era mirador which served as the provisional burial place of the Catholic Monarchs

The palace is one of the earliest known Nasrid palaces built in the Alhambra, probably first built during the reign of Muhammad II (r. 1273–1302) in the late 13th century. The preserved decoration of the palace dates from around 1370, during the reign of Muhammad V, suggesting that it may have been remodeled at that time.

After the 1492 conquest of Granada by Christian Spain, the Catholic Monarchs (Isabella and Ferdinand) converted the property into a Franciscan convent in 1494, known as San Francisco de la Alhambra ("Saint Francis of the Alhambra"). Most of the palace was demolished and replaced with a new church and convent, finished in 1495.

When Queen Isabella died in November 1504, per her last wishes, she was buried in the convent, inside a 14th-century chamber which was preserved from the former palace. In 1512, funds were granted to embellish the convent and enlarge its church. When Ferdinand died in January 1516, he was also buried here, while the construction of the new Royal Chapel, a funerary chapel attached to the city's new cathedral, was ongoing. The bodies of the two monarchs were finally moved to the finished Royal Chapel on 10 November 1521.

Two years later, Charles V granted the family of the Counts of Tendilla, descendants of Iñigo López de Mendoza y Quiñones and appointed governors of the Alhambra, the right to be buried in the convent. The convent thus hosted the family's tombs after this. There are indications that during the 16th century materials from the former Nasrid palace here were taken and reused for the construction projects that were ongoing at the time in what is now the Patio de la Reja and the Patio de Lindaraja (the courtyards north of the Palace of the Lions).

By the early 17th century, the convent was already in need of repairs, as attested by official letters requesting funds for this purpose. By 1703, the convent was again in need of repairs and in 1708 the church was in danger of collapse due to a string of winter storms, which incited authorities to free up funds to address the problems. In 1730, on the occasion of the visit of Philip V and his wife Elisabeth Farnese to Granada, more significant works to the convent were initiated, followed by further repairs between 1737 and 1738 costing 8000 reales and by another round of significant construction in 1759. Among other things, these works repaired the cloister and the church and added two chapels to the church's west side. The present-day bell tower was built in 1787, as attested by an inscription found on one of its walls. As a result of these various works, much of the building's present-day appearance dates to the 18th century.

During the French occupation of Granada in the early 19th century, the convent was used as a barracks by French troops. They caused significant damage, stripped the palace of its wooden furnishings to use them as fuel for fire, and exacerbated the Alhambra's overall state of neglect. In 1832, one thousand ducats were granted from the royal treasury to repair some of the damage to the convent. In 1840, the property was put up for auction, at which point it was purchased by the Spanish state.

By the early 20th century, the building was in a serious state of dilapidation. Restorations were undertaken between 1927 and 1929 under the direction of Leopoldo Torres Balbás, the architectural curator of the Alhambra at the time, at which time archeological excavations and studies also began to uncover some of the original Nasrid palace. Further excavations were undertaken under Torres Balbás's successor, Francisco Prieto Moreno. In the mid-20th century, these excavations uncovered the original hammam (bathhouse) of the palace. The remains of the baths were subsequently neglected again until the early 21st century, when they underwent further study and some conservation efforts. In 1945, the restored convent was converted into a state-run Parador hotel, a function it continues to serve today.

== The Nasrid palace ==
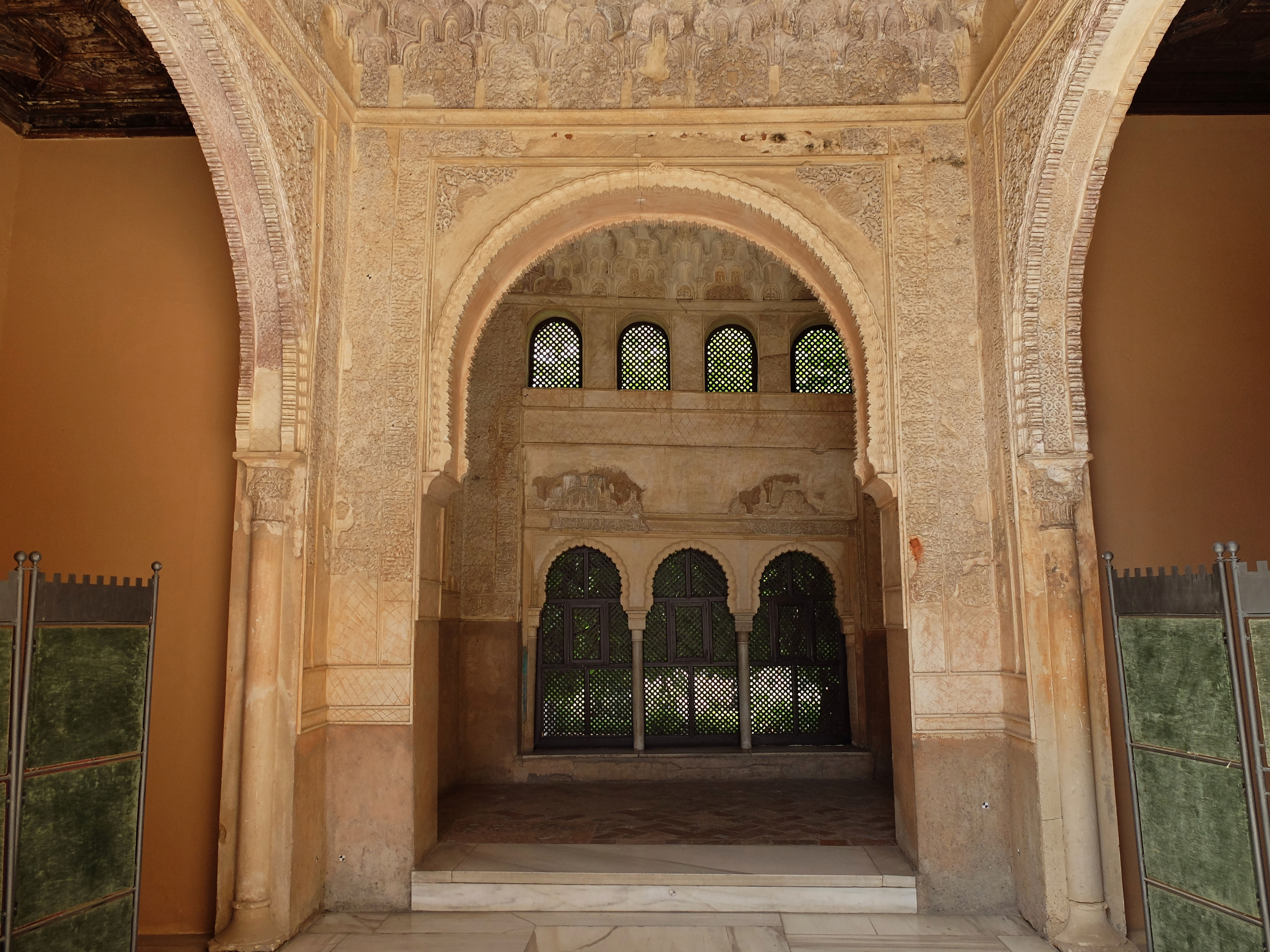
The mirador chamber on the north side of the former Nasrid palace

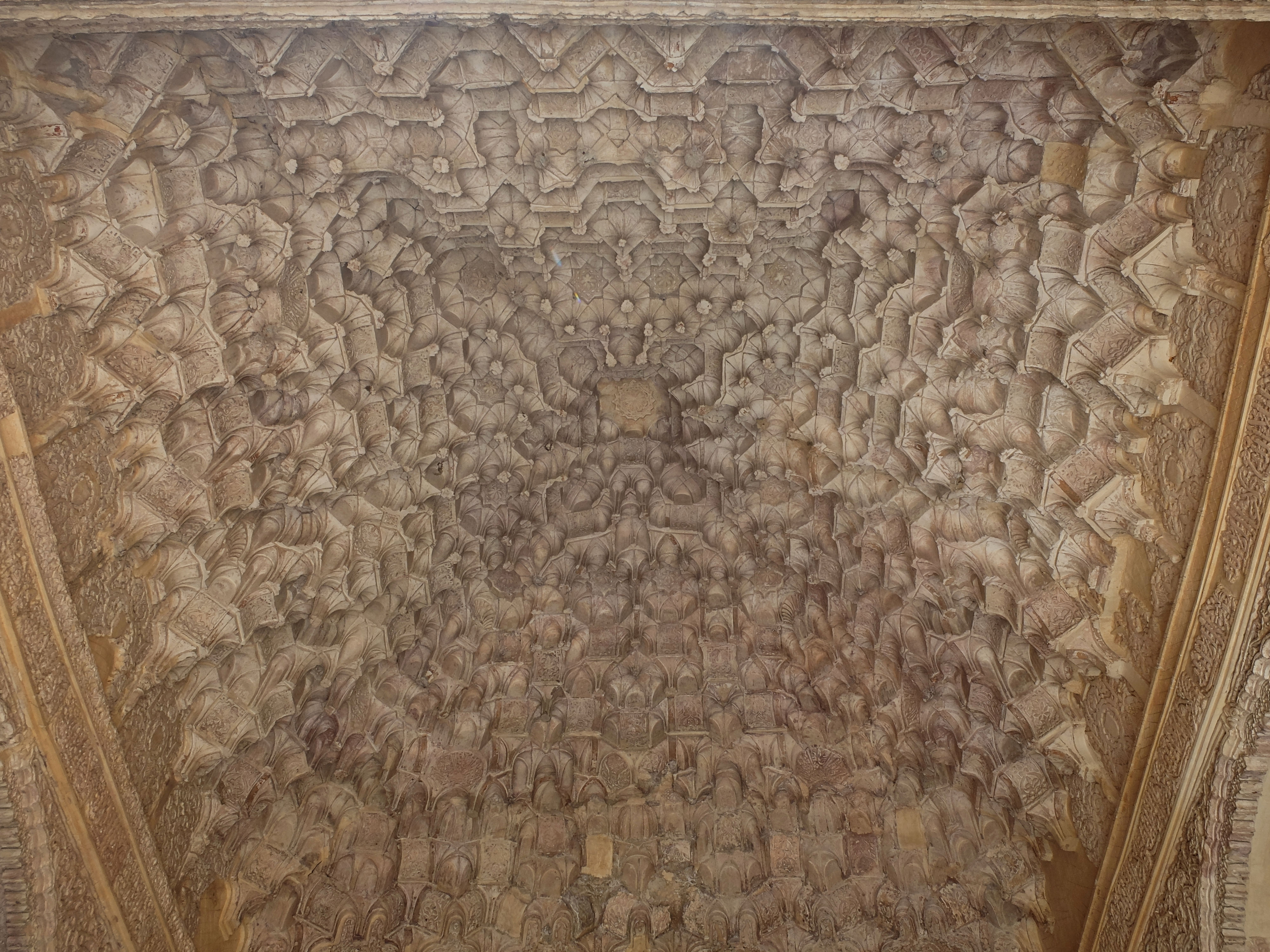
The muqarnas dome above the mirador chamber

The Nasrid palace was centered around an unusually elongated courtyard containing water features and gardens. The courtyard was about four times as long as it was wide, with its long axis oriented east to west. This layout was similar to the Patio de la Acequia in the roughly contemporary Generalife palace. Through the middle of the courtyard, running from east to west, was a water channel that was part of the Acequia Real or Acequia del Sultan, the main water channel that supplied the Alhambra with water, although the canal in the palace may have been a side branch that ran slightly south of the main channel. At both the east and west ends of the courtyard was a wide rectangular hall that was most likely preceded by a portico of three arches. Of these, only the eastern hall – now referred to as the Sala Árabe ("Arab Hall") – is partially preserved (on the east side of the present-day cloister) and still contains fragments of original Nasrid-era stucco decoration on its walls.

One feature of the palace that was innovative at the time was the presence of a domed chamber at the middle of the north side of the courtyard, aligned with the courtyard's short axis. This square chamber is covered by a large muqarnas vault ceiling and is flanked on three sides by smaller rectangular side chambers or alcoves. The northern alcove features three large windows that start near ground level and a row of four small windows above, all of which would have originally granted sweeping views of the gardens and landscapes beyond. The decoration of this space, which dates to the time of Muhammad V, consisted of carved stucco (partly preserved) and, originally, some zellij or tile decoration along the lower walls (not preserved). A partially-preserved poem inscribed along the windows refers to this chamber as a bahw (Arabic: بهو), a word equivalent to the Spanish term mirador (meaning a lookout point), which went on to be a hallmark of Nasrid architecture. This is one of the most notable Nasrid remains in the building today and it is here that Queen Isabella was first buried.

Located next to the mirador, on the west side, was a hammam, which was accessed through a side door near the mirador. It was situated below the level of the palace's water channels, allowing for an easy supply of water. The hammam included a vestibule room with a central fountain and two lateral alcoves, a cold or warm room with a bathing pool, and a hot room with another pool. Archeological excavations have discovered remains of carved stucco and tilework, indicating that the hammam was once richly decorated.

== The convent ==
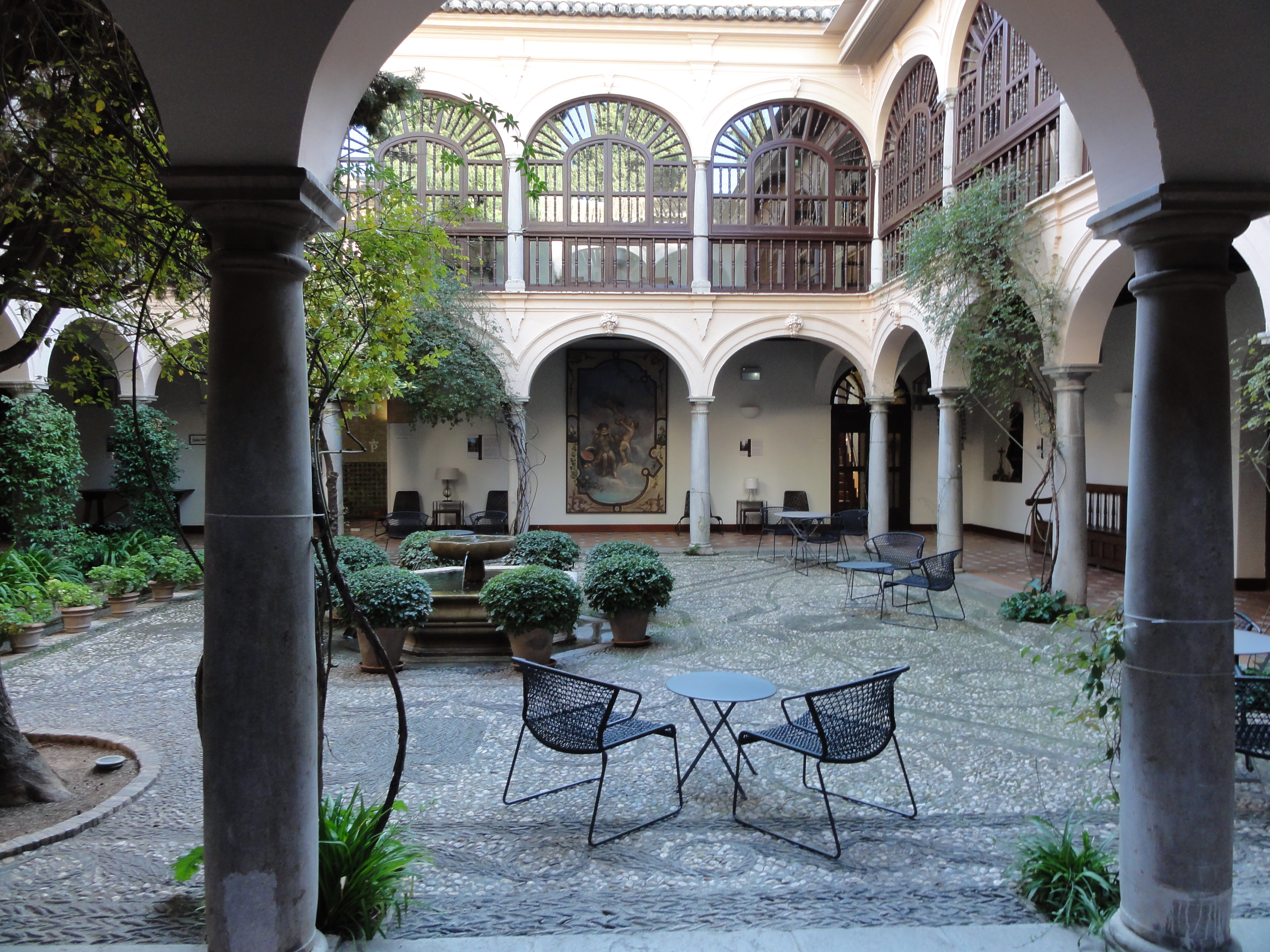
The cloister of the convent

The convent's church was located in what is now a small open courtyard leading to the 14th-century Nasrid mirador. This space was occupied by a single nave, measuring 6.20 by 21.50 meters. At its north end, the Nasrid mirador was repurposed as the capilla mayor (main chapel). This space also served as the initial burial place of Isabella and Ferdinand. According to Torres Balbás, the arched entrance to this church, as seen today, dates to the church's expansion in 1512. The upper walls and the barrel-vaulted roof of the church, missing today, fell into ruin at the end of the 19th century. The church's former interior has thus been left open to the sky since then, as Torres Balbás stated that there was little point in trying to rebuild them during restoration works. The original floor of the church was likely lower than it is today and the choir, now disappeared, was connected with the upper level of the cloister next door. Additional chapels were formerly located on the west side, while the arched niches and windows seen today on the east side, which communicate with the cloister, were once used as altars. During the restoration works by Torres Balbás in the 1920s, an underground crypt with human remains was discovered beneath the church.

The church's bell tower, built in 1787, stands next to the entrance. A Roman-era stone used in its construction was discovered during restoration works and moved to the city's archeological museum. On the west side of the church is the cloister which in its current form is roughly contemporary with the 18th-century tower, according to Torres Balbás. The cloister consists of a courtyard surrounded by a two-story gallery. The square courtyard occupies a part of what was formerly the elongated main courtyard of the Nasrid palace and the water canal of that palace once ran across the middle of this court. The arches of the cloister's galleries have Baroque-style decorations and Tuscan-style columns. The fountain at the cloister's center dates from the end of the 15th century.
