= Mirador (architecture) =

Architectural feature

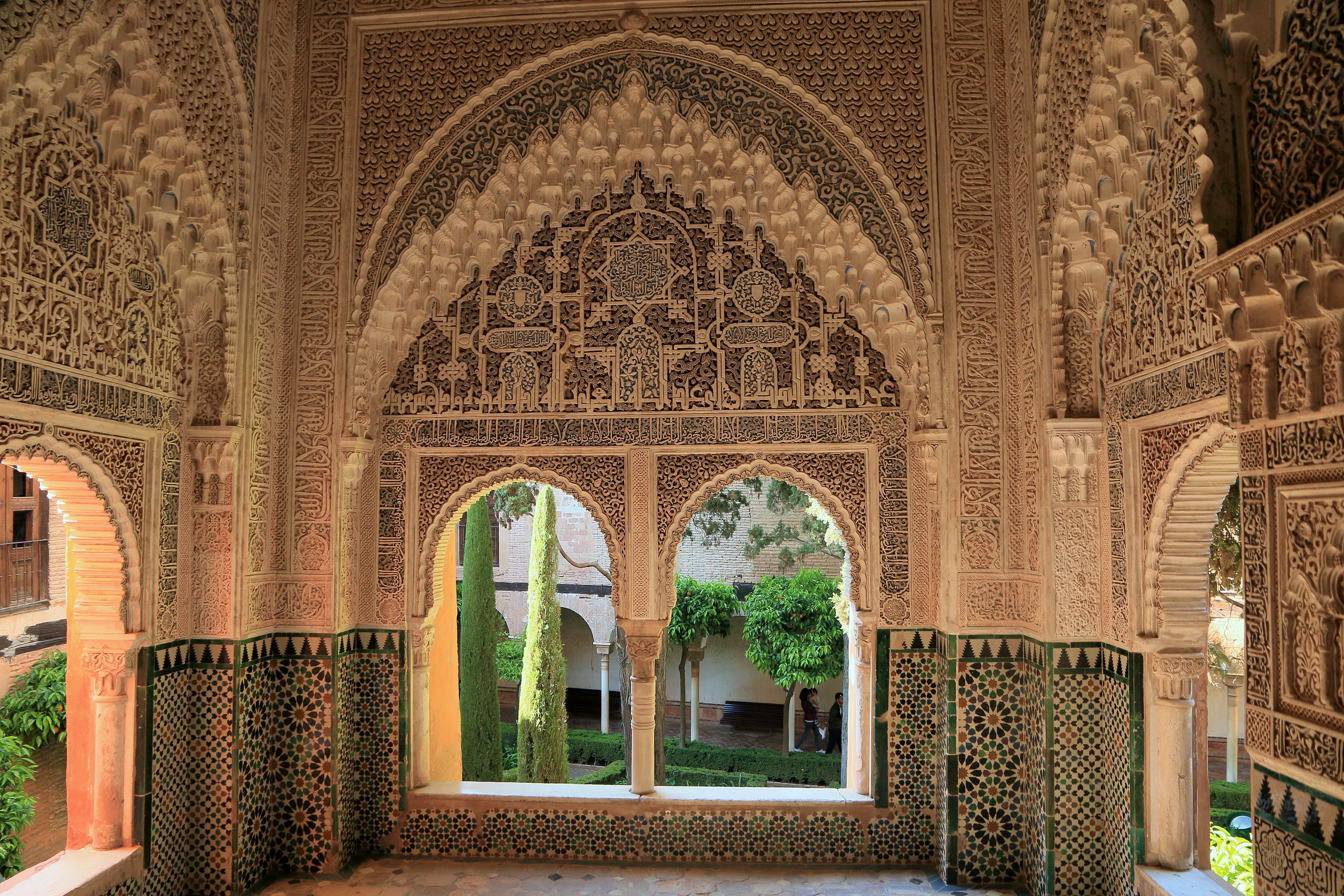
The Mirador of Lindaraja in the Alhambra of Granada, Spain, dating to the 14th century

A mirador is a Spanish term (from Spanish: mirar, lit. 'to look at') designating a lookout point or a place designed to offer extensive views of the surrounding area. In an architectural context, the term can refer to a tower, balcony, window, or other feature that offers wide views. The term is often applied to Moorish architecture, especially Nasrid architecture, to refer to an elevated room or platform that projects outwards from the rest of a building and offers 180-degree views through windows on three sides. The equivalent term in Arabic is bahw (Arabic: بهو) or manāẓir/manẓar (Arabic: منظر/ مناظر).

In Moorish architecture the mirador is typically situated on the perimeter of a building and is aligned with its central axis. It is particularly characteristic of Nasrid architecture in al-Andalus (late 13th to 15th centuries), most notably in the palaces of the Alhambra. Scholar Arnold Felix traces the development of this feature to the combination of two pre-existing features in the architecture of al-Andalus and western North Africa: halls with views over gardens in earlier Moorish architecture, such as the 10th-century example of ar-Rummāniya (an Umayyad palatial country estate outside Córdoba), and rooms projecting from the edge or rear of fortified palaces, such as in the 11th-century Castle of Monteagudo (near Murcia) and Qal'at Bani Hammad (in Algeria). The earliest true examples of the Nasrid mirador are found in the Generalife Palace and the Palace of the Convent of San Francisco. The pinnacle of mirador design is the ornate Mirador of Lindaraja in the Palace of the Lions in the Alhambra.
