= Hermitage of Santa Ana =

Hermitage of Santa Ana may also refer to:

Spain:

- Hermitage of Santa Ana, in Xàtiva (Valencia).
