= Star-painted ceiling =

Design motif in a cathedral or Christian church, replicates the night sky

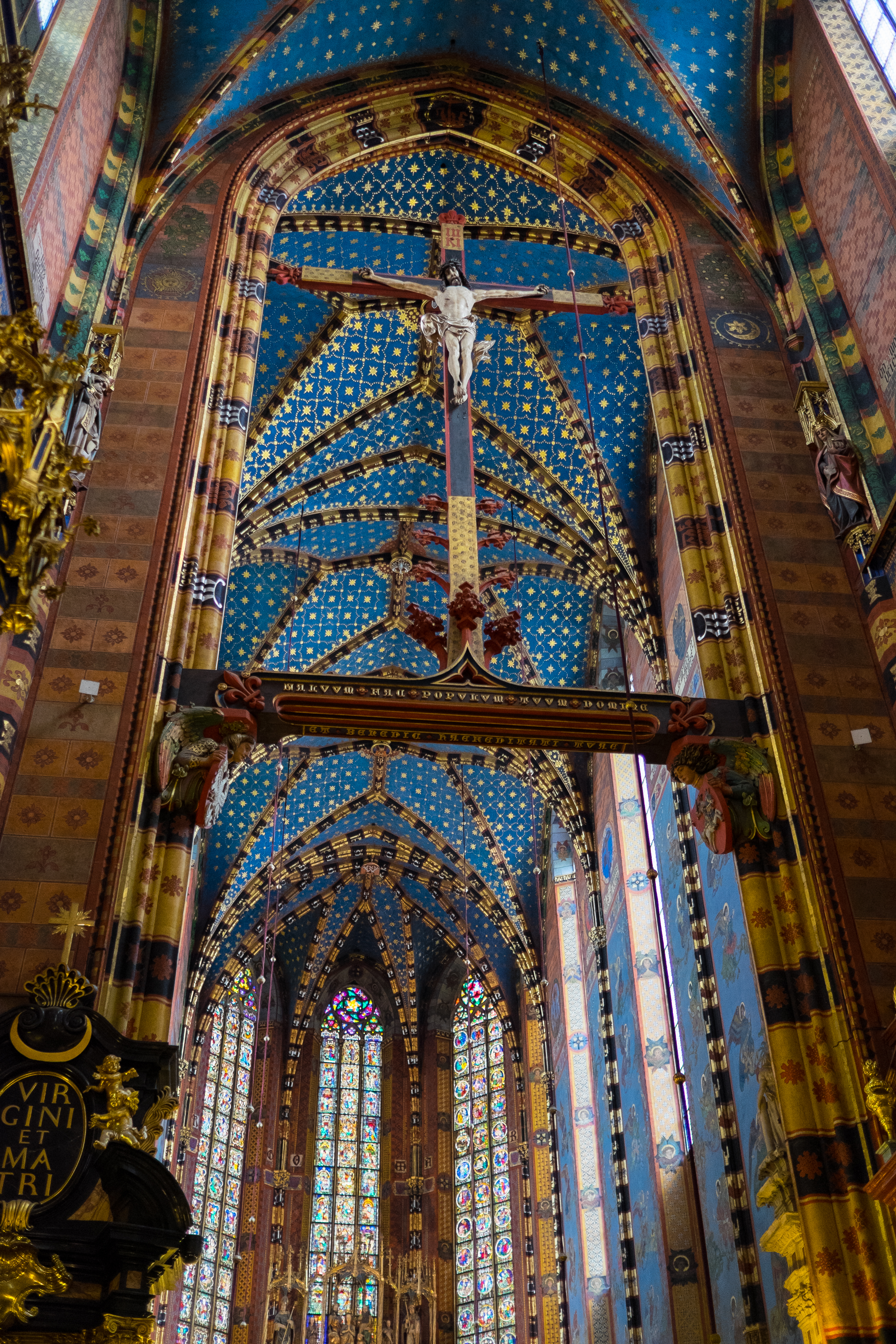
Star-painted vaulting over the apse of St. Mary's Basilica, Kraków, Poland.

A ceiling painted with stars frequently occurs as a design motif in Christian churches, artistically replicating the Earth's sky at night. Ceilings painted with stars are often found in these buildings because of symbolic associations of stars in Christianity, Judaism, and Islam. In religious buildings, this decorative feature is often white or gold stars on a blue background. As well as being a decorative technique, star-painted ceilings are also associated with astrology. It has been used as a way to accurately depict the night sky such as in planetariums. Ceilings painted with stars are also a decorative feature sometimes found in houses, particularly in children's rooms.

== History ==
Illustrations, paintings, and murals of the sky, heavens, and stars have a long history as a source of decoration. The Imperial temple in Palmyra, approximately constructed in the late 2nd century BC, is one of the earliest known examples of a religious building that features star-painted ceilings as a decorative motif. Outside of religious context, this motif has also been found in villas, and bath houses in Palmyra during this same time period.

Star-painted ceilings have also been found in caves within the Navajo region, with the majority located in the state of New Mexico. The stars painted in this area are presented as cross [x] shapes. They are painted using various pigments including red, blue, black, yellow, and green. It is believed that the ceilings in this area were painted between 1000 - 1525 AD.

Vaults in places of worship became a popular place to paint night skies throughout Europe during the 12th to 16th centuries. This motif of painted vaults, also referred to as starry vaults, is linked to Gothic architecture. An example of a chapel that features star-painted vaults is the Sainte-Chapelle, located in Paris, France. The vaults of the upper-chapel feature gold painted stars on a dark blue background. The earliest known instance of a star-painted vault related to Christianity is a baptistery at the city of Dura-Europos which is dated approximately 300 AD. The stars in the baptistery were painted white, painted over a blue background, and featured eight points.

Islamic artists began using complex geometric patterns involving stars as a form of ceiling decoration from the 9th century through to the 16th century. The shape of the stars took many forms over this period, becoming more embellished over time with complex shapes and details taking centerstage. For instance, the simple five-pointed star was favoured during the 9th century. While by the 16th century stars with 16 points were more commonly portrayed.

Into the late 20th and early 21st century, star-painted ceilings have continued to be created. However, during this period star-painted ceilings have been created more commonly on a commercial scale such as in homes and nurseries. This decorative feature takes a range of forms but has been created using gold stars on a blue ceiling, black and white, or glow in the dark paint.

== Symbolism ==
=== Mithras ===
Ceilings that featured stars found in the Roman Empire during the 2nd and 3rd centuries were frequently used as a way to illustrate Mithras. During this time, the deity's cloak was painted dark blue with gold stars painted on top, decorating the cloak.

=== Christ ===
In Christianity, stars have a long history as sacred symbols. In churches, pentagrams, which are commonly used to represent stars, are painted on the ceilings of churches and cathedrals. Unlike stars which are painted solidly and have a variety of points, the pentagram is five-pointed with a hollow centre. Art historian Alva William's states that these pentacles symbolise the five wounds of Christ and is thought to “ward off evil spirits”.

=== The Star of David ===
The Star of David is a symbol used in Judaism and can be found painted on the ceilings of some synagogues. It is represented as a six-pointed hexagram and is associated with “Hebrew mysticism”. Ceilings that have the Star of David painted on the ceiling include the Sha'ar HaShamayim Synagogue (also known as the “Gate of Heaven Synagogue”). In the synagogue, a large Star of David has been painted on the ceiling with smaller stars surrounding it.

=== Heaven and cosmology ===
Stars are a recurring decorative motif in both Christianity and Judaism. However, stars used for decoration have several different symbolic associations depending on their depiction.

Stars individually used for decoration have several different symbolic associations in Christianity. The scholar Jodi Magness suggests that by the 6th century the central dome of churches, often located in the centre of the church, started to become recognised as a ‘heavenly’ place that was symbolically linked to cosmology. Because of this association, the central dome is where star-painted ceilings are still often located in religious buildings. This can be seen in churches such as St. Peter's Basilica in Rome and the Siena Cathedral, located in Tuscany.

Jodi Magness also states that during the 4th century Jewish places of worship represented “the Garden of Eden or Paradise, a place where heaven and earth were united”. However, during this time many of the star-studded ceilings and domes were created using mosaic tiles rather than paint. Nevertheless, this connection to heaven and symbolic use of stars can be seen continuing to be recreated into the 19th and 20th centuries, such as seen in the Grand Synagogue of Edirne. The synagogue was built in 1906 and features large vaulted ceilings covered in thousands of small painted white, gold, and black stars on a sky-blue background.

== Churches and cathedrals ==
The depiction of heaven and the sky is a recurring decorative feature that can be found in several Christian churches, chapels, and cathedrals. These illustrations of heaven and the sky frequently feature the decorative motifs of stars. This recurring motif is associated with several different artistic and architectural movements. Stars are referred to throughout the Bible, often in symbolic connection to heaven, for example, “the stars of heaven and their constellations”. It must also be noted that this motif may take on several different meanings depending on the cultural context, time period, and the viewer.

Historians Ellen Swift and Anne Alwis claim that star-painted ceilings were painted to represent the heavens within the sphere of Christianity and illustrate a heavenly place outside the natural world. Ceilings decorated in stars have also been found in baptistries. Swift and Alwis state that star-painted ceilings associated with cosmology may have been used as a way to illustrate that the one being baptised was symbolically going to be “reborn into a new world”.

The Scrovegni Chapel is an example of a star-painted ceiling. It was painted by Giotto di Bondone and his assistants between 1303 - 1305 A.D. The work depicts scenes from the Bible, with hundreds of geometrically aligned stars mixed into the mural. The eight-pointed stars have been painted gold and cover the vibrant blue arched ceiling.

Another example of a church featuring star-painted ceilings is the Notre-Dame Basilica in Montreal. The interior of the church was built during the 19th century and is an example of Gothic revival architecture. Similar to Gothic it features vaults that are decorated with gold painted stars, the gold stars cover the blue vaulted ceilings of the church.

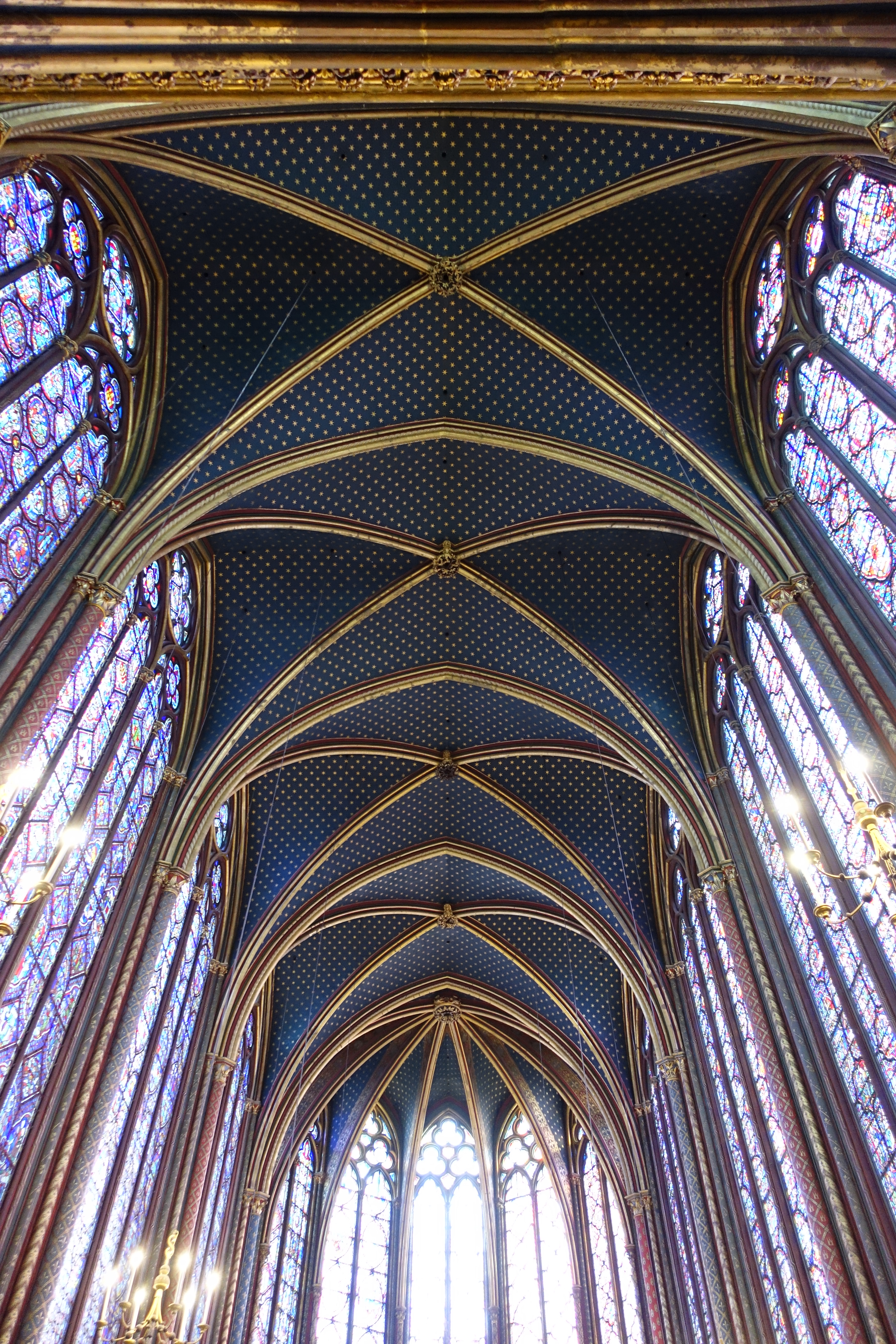
Star-painted vaulting in the upper chapel (Chapelle Haute) of Sainte-Chapelle, Paris. Gold stars on a deep blue background represent the heavens.

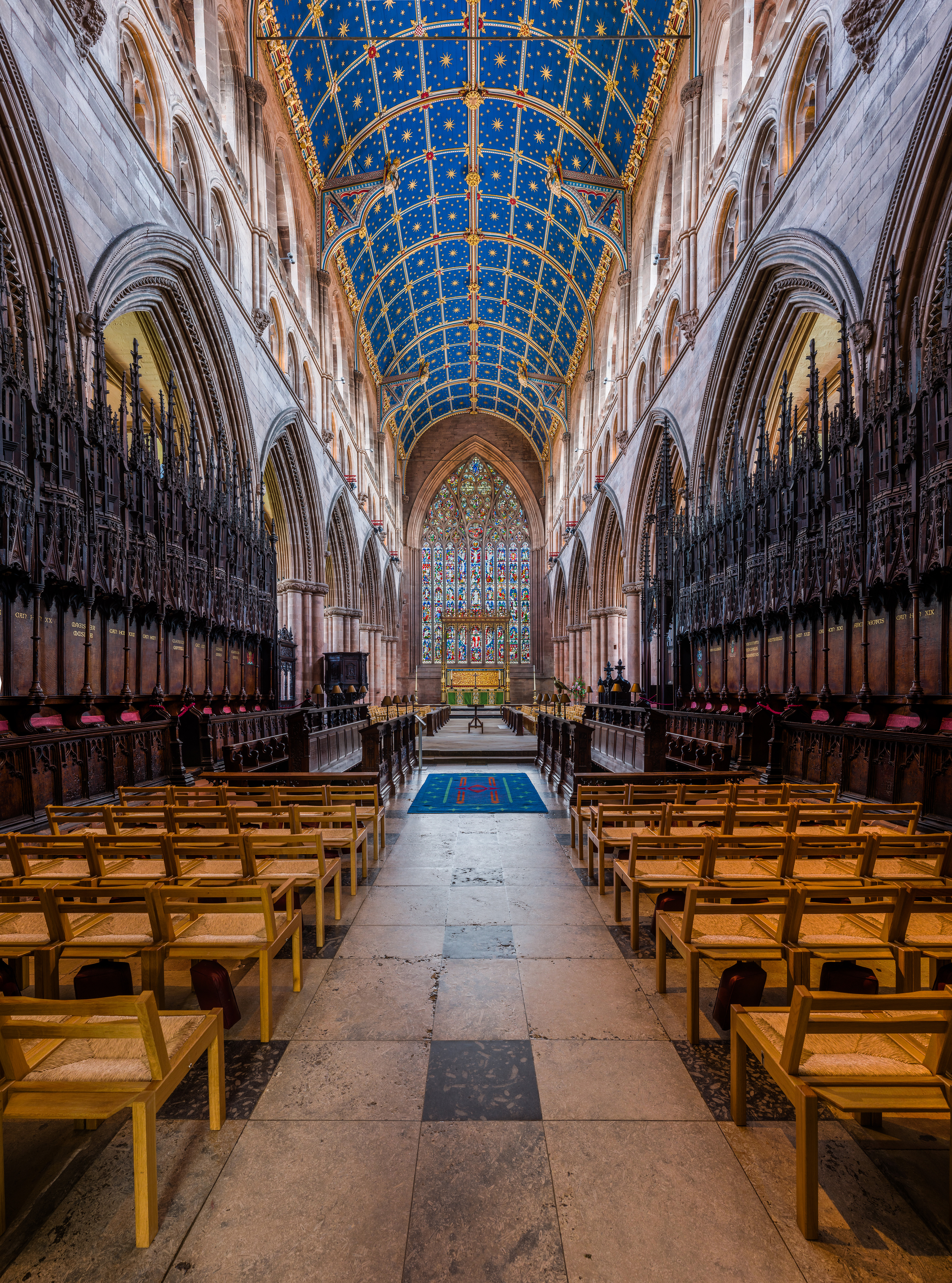
A starry vault over the chancel of Carlisle Cathedral in Cumbria in northern England.

== Synagogues ==
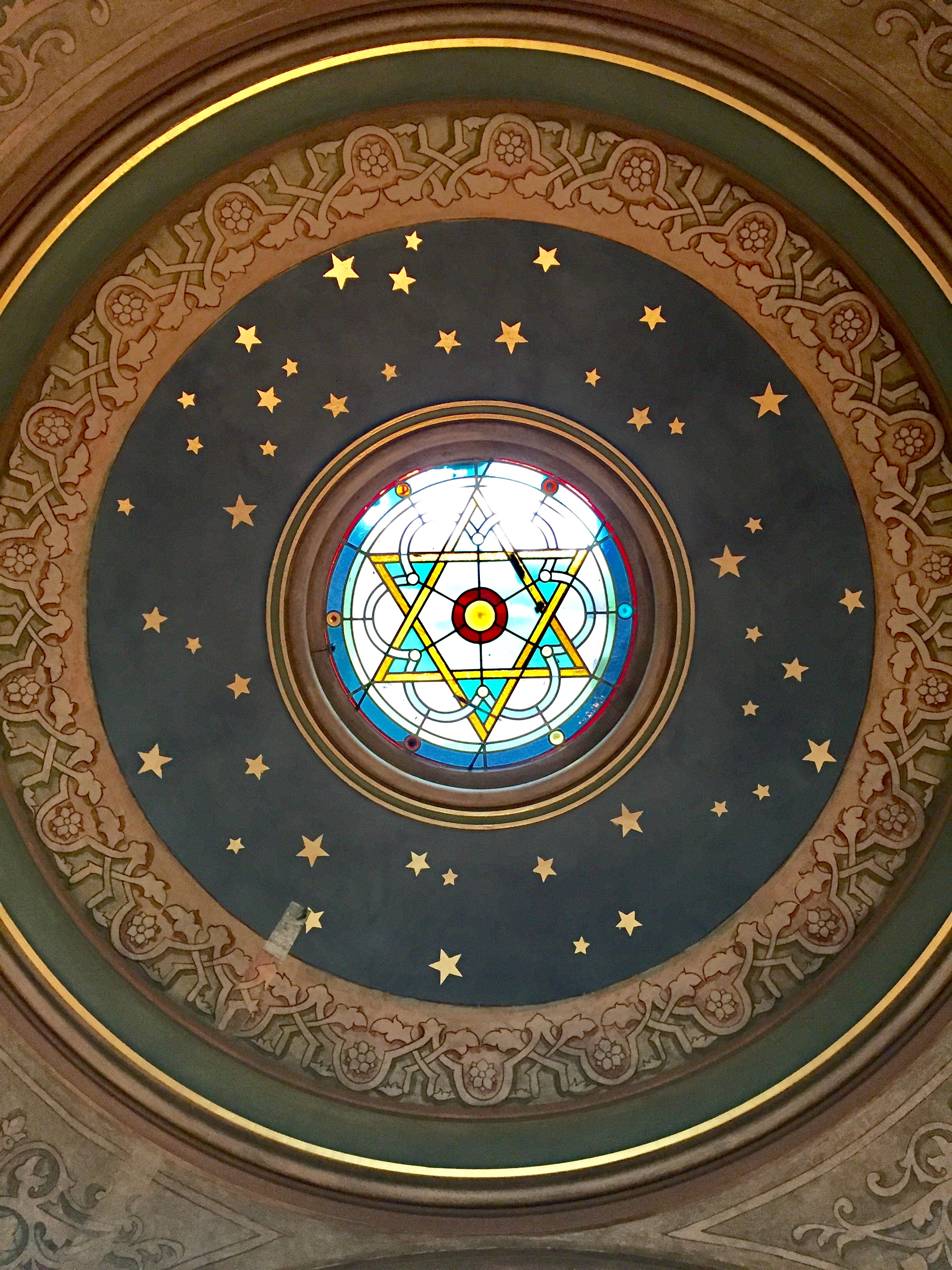
A section of the Eldridge Street Synagogue which has been painted blue with golden stars

Much like other religious buildings such as churches and cathedrals, a ceiling decorated in stars is a recurring motif in Synagogues. Like the Bible, the Torah also references stars, “look heavenward and count the stars”. Star-painted ceilings are often used as a decoration feature in the central section of a synagogue.

There are many examples of star-painted ceilings in synagogues, particularly in those built during the late 19th century such as the Synagogue of Modena (La Sinagoga di Modena). This synagogue was built in 1873 and is one of the largest in Italy. It features a large central dome ceiling which is painted blue and covered in golden stars. This location of the mural is significant because, as noted before, this area of the synagogue is recognised as a particularly holy place close to heaven.

Another example of star-painted ceilings as a central decorative motif in a Synagogue is the Eldridge Street Synagogue, located in New York City, which features five-pointed gold stars painted on a blue dome within the building. The dome which features these stars is well lit with natural lighting because of the multiple stained-glass windows that surround it. As a result, the golden stars reflect the light, creating the illusion that they are glowing. Another example of a synagogue that features stars painted on the ceiling is Central Synagogue, also located in New York City. Unlike the Eldridge Street Synagogue, the majority of the stars painted in this building have eight points.

== Mosques ==
Stars have symbolic value in the Islamic faith. References to stars can be found throughout the Quran, “Behold, We have adorned the skies nearest to the earth with the beauty of stars”. As there are little to no depictions of human figures in mosques it is common for scripture and decorative features, such as stars, to fill the inside of the religious buildings.

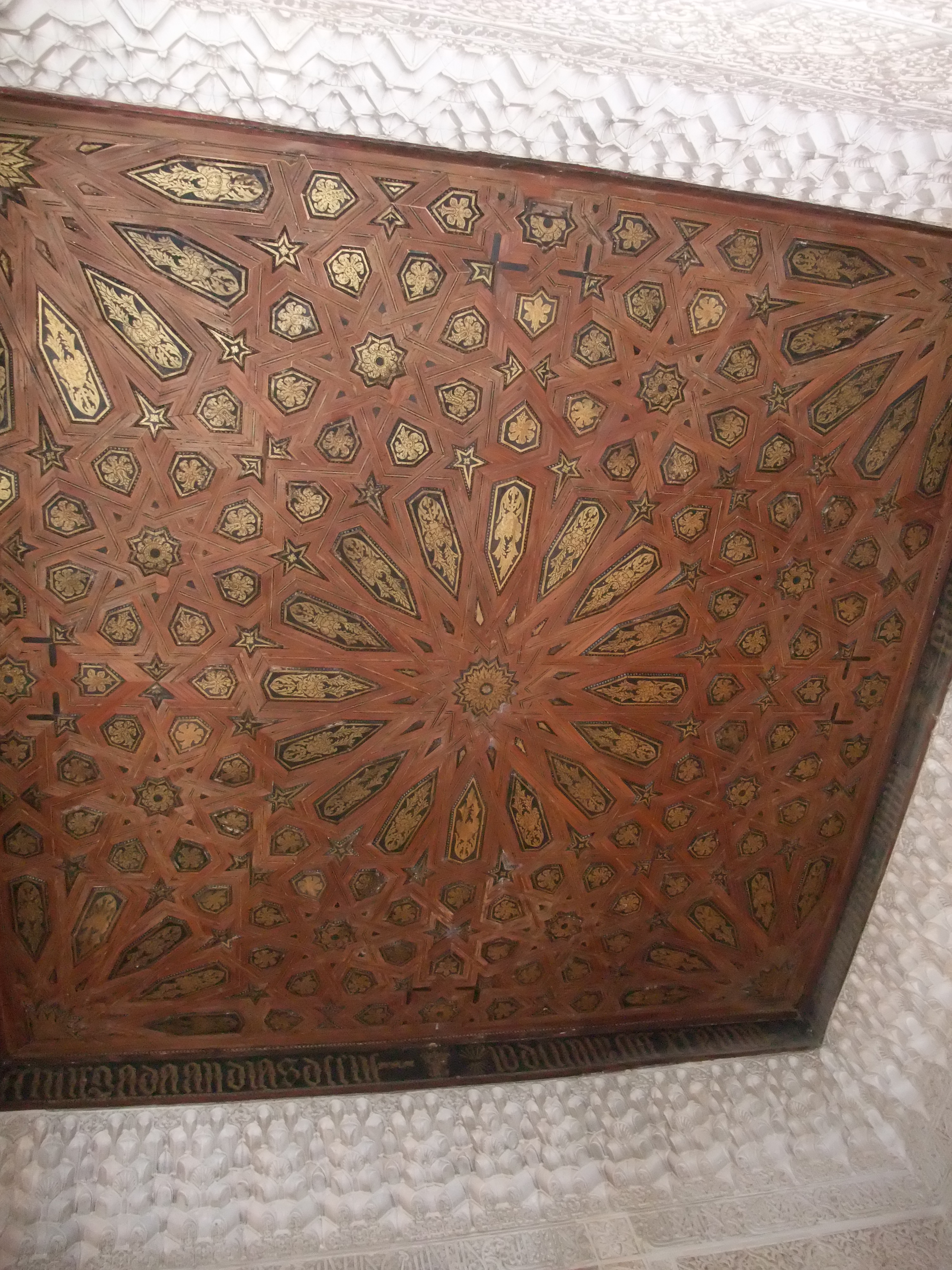
A section of the ceiling in Mexuar. Various patterns and shapes (stars) have been carved into the ceiling which have then been painted gold.

Many of the geometric patterns featured in the ceilings of Mosques are created using mosaics. However, there are some, such as the Nasrid palace complex in Spain, that use paint to create the star polygon design. The ceiling of the Mexuar, one part of the Nasrid palace complex, was designed in the 16th century and features star polygons with eight points. This decorative mural was created using gold paint which was applied to the carved wooden ceiling.

== Other buildings ==
As well as being a decorative technique, star-painted ceilings have been created which accurately depict the night sky and constellation systems. While stars painted in religious contexts such as found churches, synagogues, and mosques are more widely referenced there are many instances where stars have been painted on ceilings outside of religious context throughout history. Some examples of detailed-star painted ceilings are listed below.

=== Grand Central Terminal ===
A starry mural in New York's Grand Central Terminal depicts a semi-accurate night sky. The ceiling is decorated with over 2,500 stars and illustrates a North American winter night sky around December 1 - February 28. The constellation arrangement was a replicant of the 1603 star atlas that was created by Johann Bayer. However, the mural is not a fully accurate representation of the night sky as it was painted back to front.

=== Rijksmuseum ===
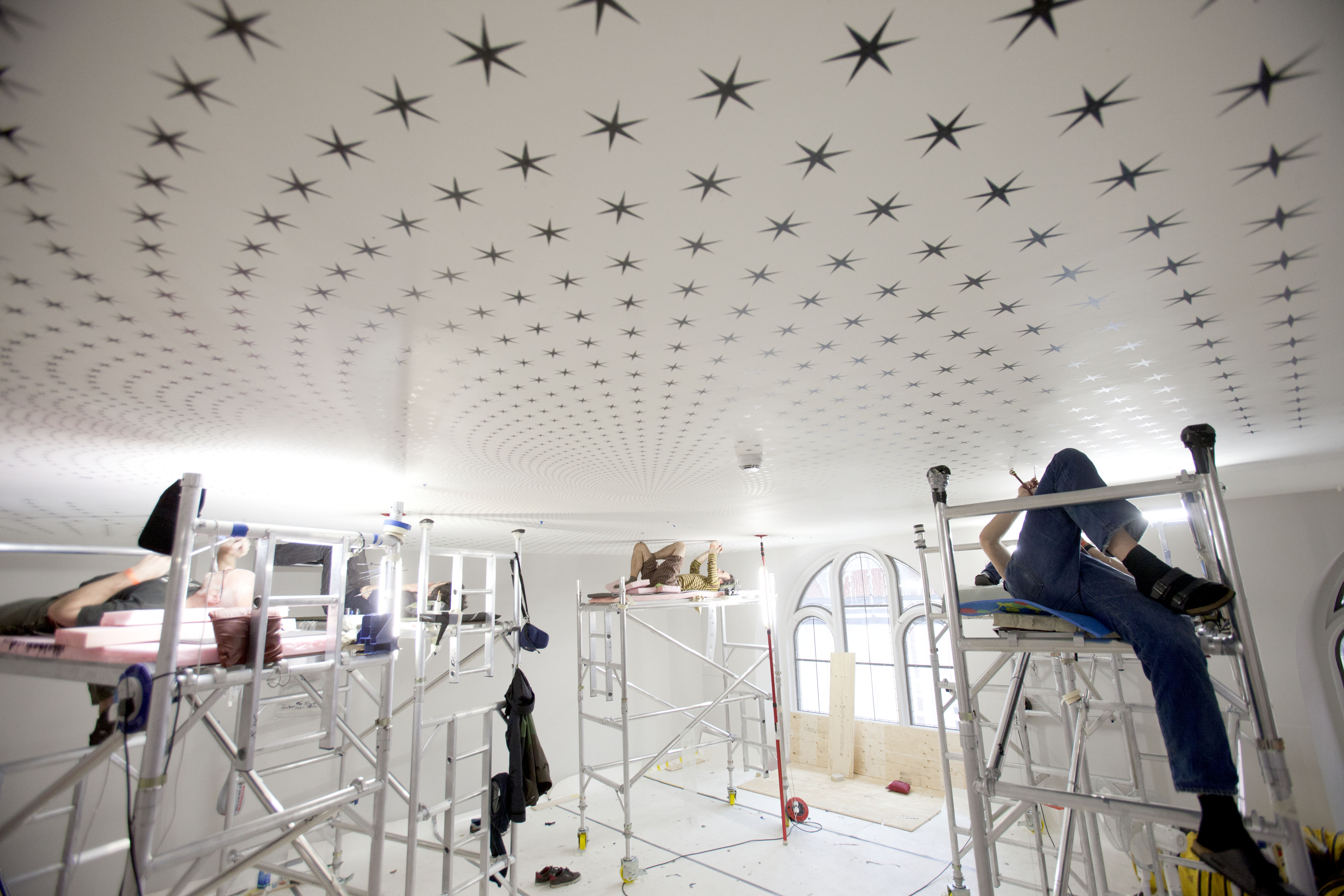
The star-painted mural on the ceiling at the Rijksmuseum in Amsterdam

The mural at the Rijksmuseum in Amsterdam is a contemporary example of a star-painted ceiling. The installation was painted in 2013 and consists of 47,000 painted black stars on a plain white ceiling. The six-pointed stars were hand-painted by Richard Wright and his art team over a period of two months.

=== Tombs ===
Star-painted ceilings were found in the tomb of Yintun located in Luoyang. The mural is located in the central tomb chamber and is painted on a domed ceiling. Unlike the common depiction of pointed gold stars on a blue background, the stars painted in the tomb are circular and vary in colour from white to orange. As well as stars, the mural includes depictions of animals and symbols which historian Feng Shi states represent different constellation systems.

Star-painted ceilings have also been found in dozens of ancient tombs in Korea. The collection of tombs known as the Complex of Koguryo Tombs (Goguryeo tombs) features complex constellation systems which include detailed illustrations of both the sun and lunar cycles. One of the tombs that is part of the Complex of Koguryo features the astronomical chart known as Cheonsang Yeolcha Bunyajido (天象列次分野之圖) and is dated 1395 A.D. The mural itself features a constellation system that includes approximately 1,500 painted and engraved stars that mimic real star systems found in the night sky viewed from Korea during the Joseon dynasty.

=== Planetariums ===
Decorated ceilings have also been used in planetariums. An example of this is the Hamburg Planetarium where a large circular ceiling within the planetarium has been painted blue with star constellations and zodiac signs painted on top in gold.

== Examples ==
The dome of Lovely Lane Methodist Church in Baltimore, designed by Stanford White, was decorated with the stars as they were thought to have appeared in the night sky on the morning of the church's dedication, 6 November 1887.

Other examples of star-painted ceilings include:

- Notre-Dame Basilica (Montreal)
- Carlisle Cathedral, England (at left)
- Church of Santiago, Málaga, Spain
- Saint Gertrude Church, in Darłowo, Poland
- Hermitage of Santa Ana, in Xàtiva, Spain
- St. Mary's Basilica, Kraków, Poland
- Sainte-Chapelle, in Paris, France
- Siena Cathedral, in Siena, Italy
- The original ceiling of the Sistine Chapel in Rome at Pope Sixtus IV's time was a starry "vault of Heaven," done in gold and lapis lazuli. This is attributed to Pier Matteo d'Amelia. In 1506 Pope Julius II appointed Michelangelo to repaint the ceiling with scenes from the Book of Genesis
- St. Ulrich's and St. Afra's Abbey, in Bavaria, Germany
- Santo Domingo de la Calzada Cathedral, in La Rioja, Spain
- Toledo Cathedral, Spain
- Mausoleum of the Andrássy Family, Trebišov, Slovakia
- The Forum Auditorium in the Pennsylvania State Capitol Complex (Harrisburg, Pennsylvania) has a ceiling which mimics the night sky. Each major star is represented by an electric light, and the constellations they form are painted and labelled around them.

== See also ==
- Arch
- Atmospheric theatre
- Vault (architecture)
- Star chamber

== External links and references ==
- A YouTube which mentions starry vaults
- Discussion of starry vaults
- Many photos of starry vaults
