= Hermitage of Santa Ana (Xàtiva) =

Coordinates: 39°1′52.2″N 0°31′54.83″W

- Hermitage of Santa Ana (Xàtiva)
- Hermitage of Santa Ana (Xàtiva)
- Location: Xàtiva (Valencia)
- Country: Spain
- Denomination: Roman Catholic

History
- Founded: 15th century

Administration
- Diocese: Valencia

The Hermitage of Santa Anna is a religious building located in the surroundings of Xàtiva (València), Spain, built in the 15th century.

To reach the hermitage it is necessary to cross the neighboring town of La Llosa de Ranes and to take the way of the Baños that ascends to the territorial part belonging to the municipality of Xàtiva, located at the peak of a conical mount. From this summit the countrysides of Xàtiva, the city, and its castles can be seen as well as, when looking a little bit to the south, the mountains of Mariola, Aitana, and Benicadell. To the north is the riverside of Xúquer, and to the west is the Mediterranean and Castile.

== History ==
It's the most modern building in Xativa of the three conserved buildings of crucería vault, and the only one without any ogival arch. The hermitage is of gothic-flamenco style and it was built by the middle of the 15th century. Later work (adding a high choir and starry vault) was helped in part by Rodrigo Borgia.

The building is rectangular, with buttresses and smooth semicircular segments. The ship has three bays with ribbed vaults separated by transverse arches. The placement of some trumpets in the angles transform the head into a false apse. The nerves of the arches rest to half height it has more than enough cantilevers that are flat in the ship and esculturados in the apse.

There are remains of the stables and of the door that gave access to the enclosure, but much of the old property (the hermit's house, the hostelry, the stairway of the choir, the walls and the roofs of the porch) have disappeared.

== See also ==
- Route of the Borgias
