= Mexuar =

Historic palace in Granada, Spain

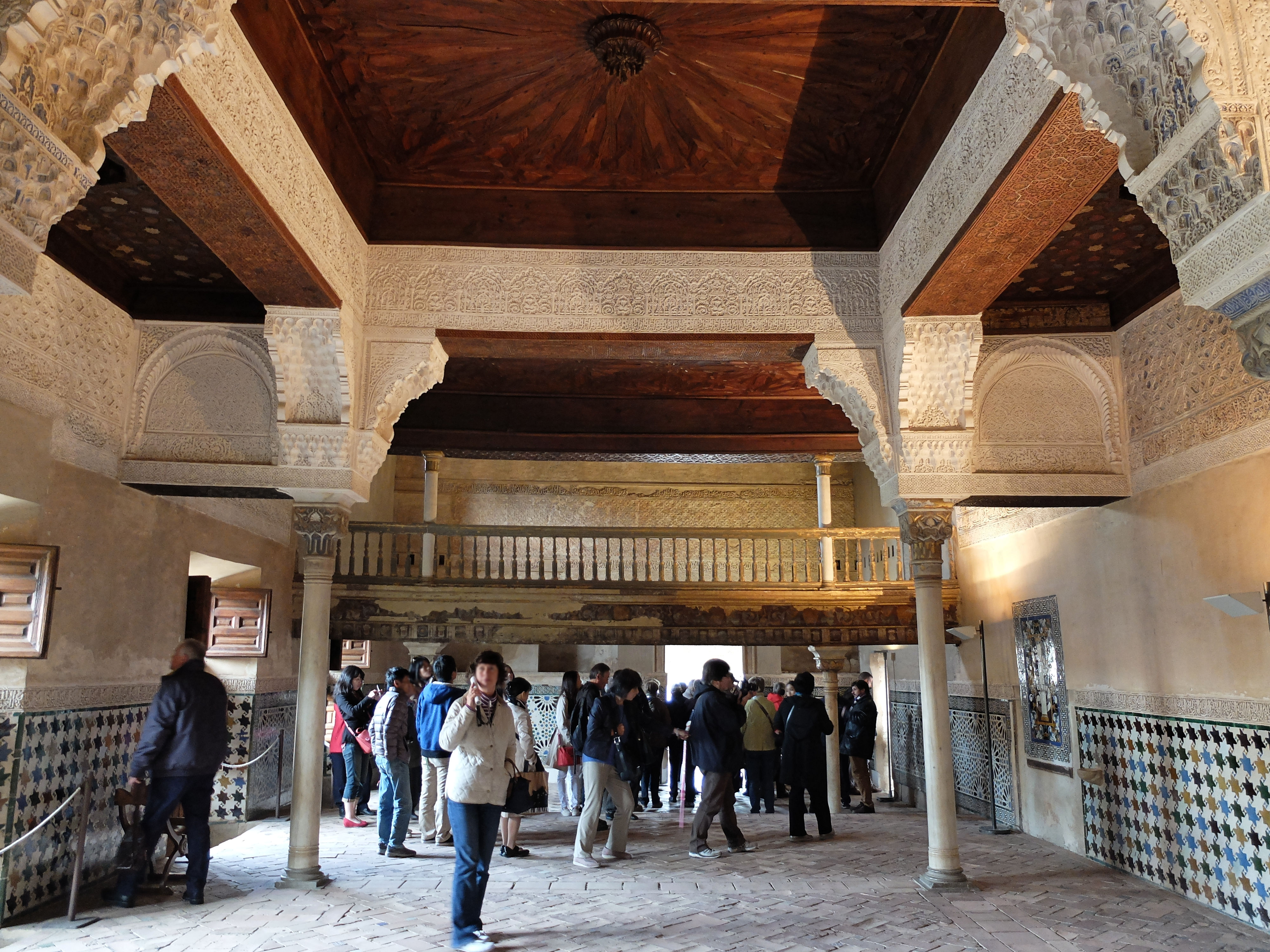
- Interactive map of the Mexuar area

General information
- Type: Palace
- Architectural style: Moorish (Nasrid period)
- Location: Alhambra, Granada, Spain
- Coordinates: 37.177336°N 3.589969°W

Technical details
- Material: brick, wood, stucco

The Mexuar (Spanish: Mexuar; Arabic: مشور, romanized: mashwar) is a section of the Nasrid palace complex in the Alhambra of Granada, Spain. It served as the entrance wing of the Comares Palace, the official palace of the sultan and the state, and it housed various administrative functions. After the 1492 conquest of Granada by Christian Spain the building's main hall was converted into a chapel, though many of the Christian additions were later removed during modern restorations. The palace's two main courtyards were also put to other uses and only their foundations remain visible today.

== Etymology ==
The Spanish name Mexuar comes from the Arabic word mashwar (Arabic: مشور), meaning "place of counsel" or "conference area". The term is used in North Africa as well, for example to denote a public square or reception area at the entrance of a royal palace in Morocco where public ceremonies took place or petitions were received. The Mechouar Palace in Tlemcen, Algeria, is another example.

== History ==
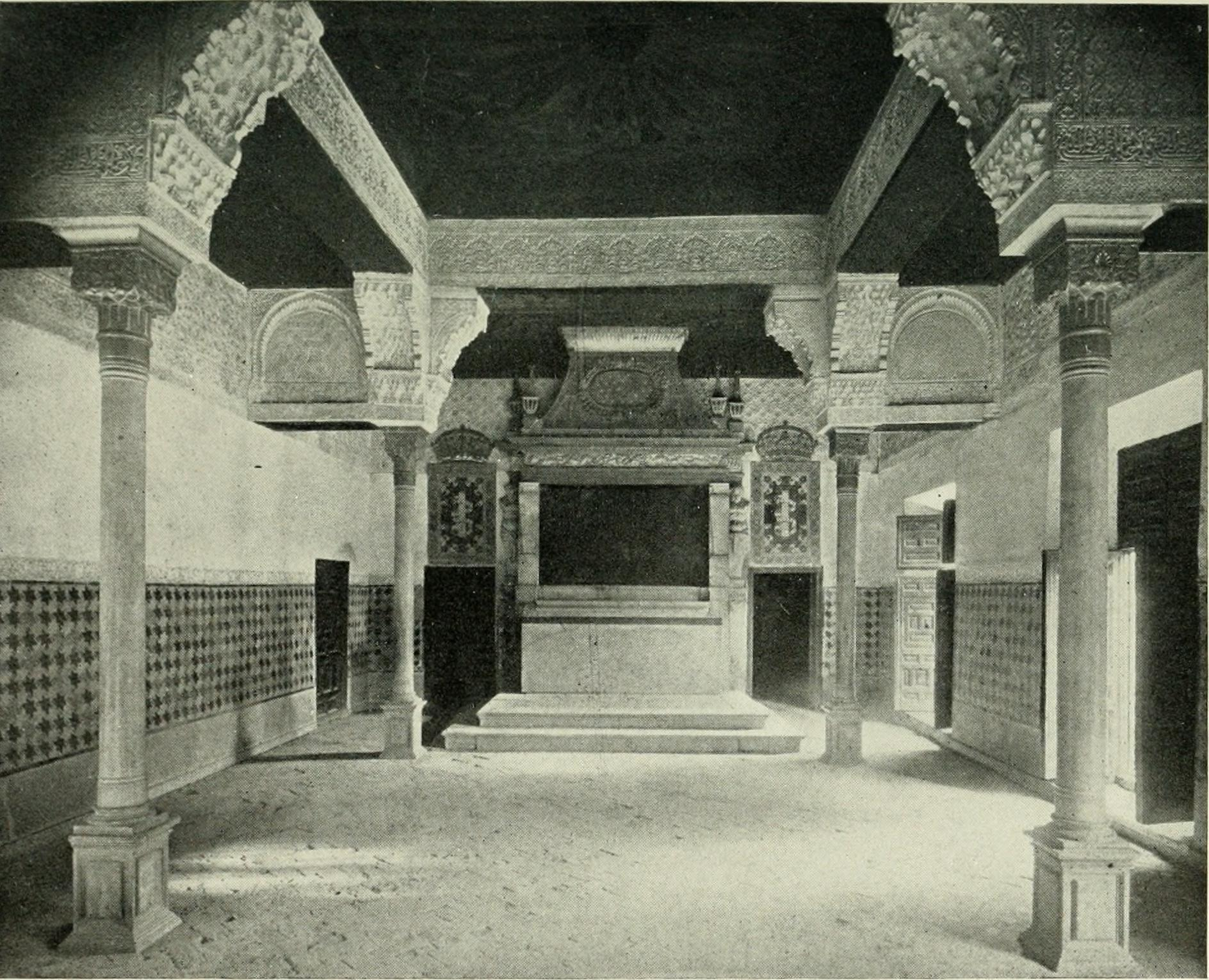
The Sala del Mexuar (Council Hall) in 1913, with some features of the Christian chapel still visible on the far wall before they were removed in modern restorations

The Alhambra was a palace complex and citadel begun in 1238 by Muhammad I Ibn al-Ahmar, the founder of the Nasrid dynasty that ruled the Emirate of Granada. Several palaces were built and expanded by his successors Muhammad II (r. 1273–1302) and Muhammad III (r. 1302–1309). In 1314 Isma'il I came to the throne and undertook many further works in the Alhambra. His reign marked the beginning of the "classical" period or high point of Nasrid architecture. Isma'il decided to build a new palace complex to serve as the official palace of the sultan and the state, known as the Qaṣr al-Sultan or Dār al-Mulk. The core of this complex was the Comares Palace, while another wing, the Mexuar, extended to the west and acted as the public sector of the complex and the entrance to the Comares Palace. The Council Hall or Sala del Mexuar was first built in this time.

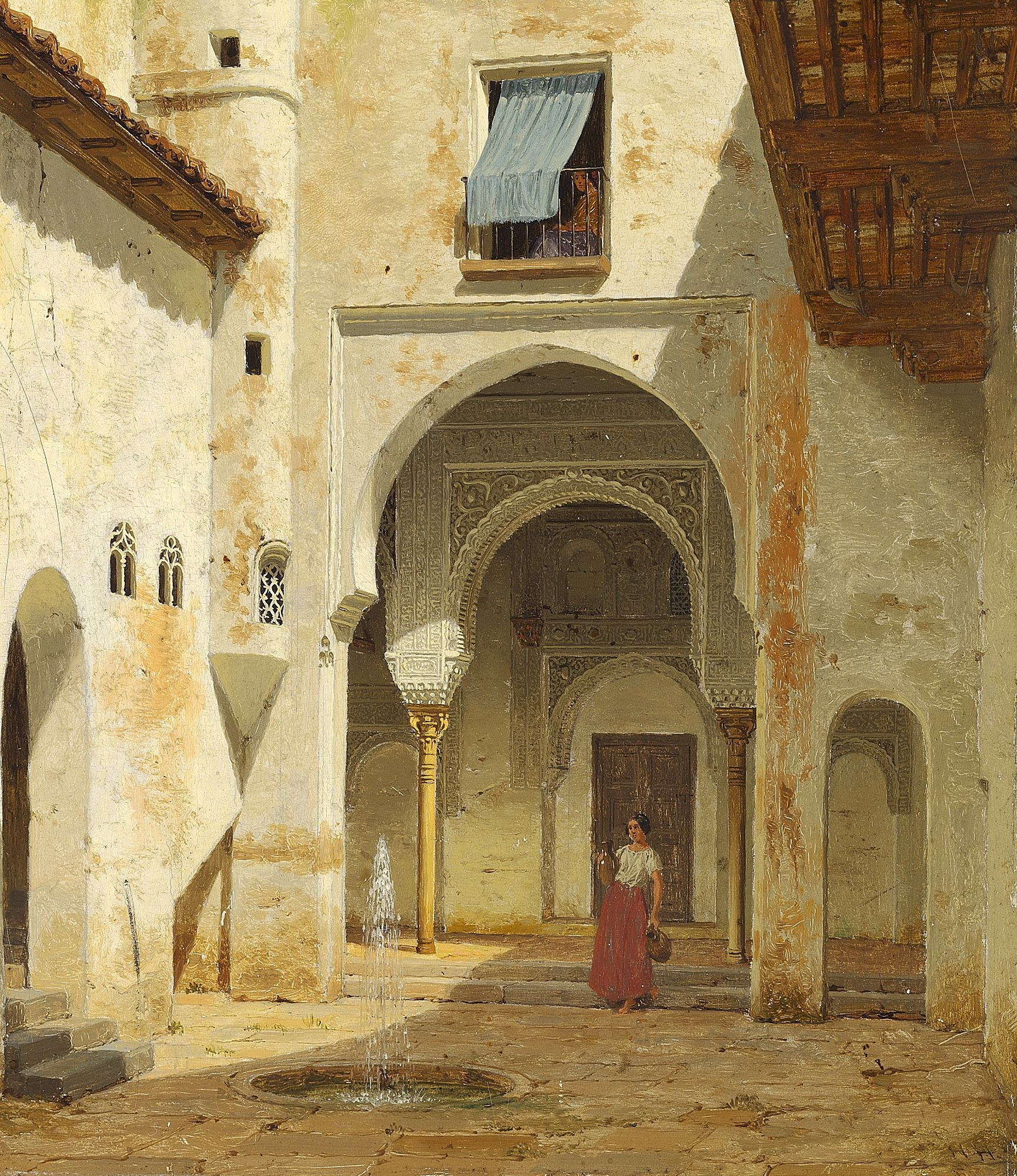
19th-century painting of the Patio del Cuarto Dorado before modern restorations removed some of the post-1492 additions

Yusuf I (r. 1333–1354) expanded the Comares Palace. He also built or converted existing towers along the northern walls of the Alhambra to serve new purposes, including the Torre de Machuca in the Mexuar's second courtyard. Under Muhammad V (r. 1354–1359 and 1362–1391) Nasrid architecture reached its apogee, which is evident in the nearby Palace of the Lions which he built to the east of the Comares Palace. Between 1362 and 1365 he rebuilt or significantly refurbished the Mexuar. The writings of Ibn al-Khatib recount that in December 1362 Muhammad V held lavish festivities in the Mexuar to celebrate the birthday of the Prophet Muhammad. The Comares Façade on the south side of the Patio del Cuarto Dorado is dated to 1370 during his reign.

After the 1492 conquest of Granada by the Catholic Monarchs, the Alhambra was converted into a royal palace of Christian Spain. Significant modifications were carried out in the Mexuar and in the environment around the Comares Palace. The Patio de Machuca is so named because the Spanish Renaissance architect Pedro Machuca, who worked on the Palace of Charles V and other additions to the Alhambra for Charles V, resided here in the 16th century. Significant modifications to this courtyard happened during the Christian era of the Alhambra. The Council Hall was converted into a Christian chapel in the 16th century, which entailed the dismantling of the hall's central dome in 1540 in order to add an upper floor. The Patio del Cuarto Dorado was also heavily modified in order to convert it into a residence. Isabella of Portugal resided here when she visited in 1526 with her husband Charles V. The residence was later used by the governors of the Alhambra and was still in use in the 19th century when Washington Irving visited the site.

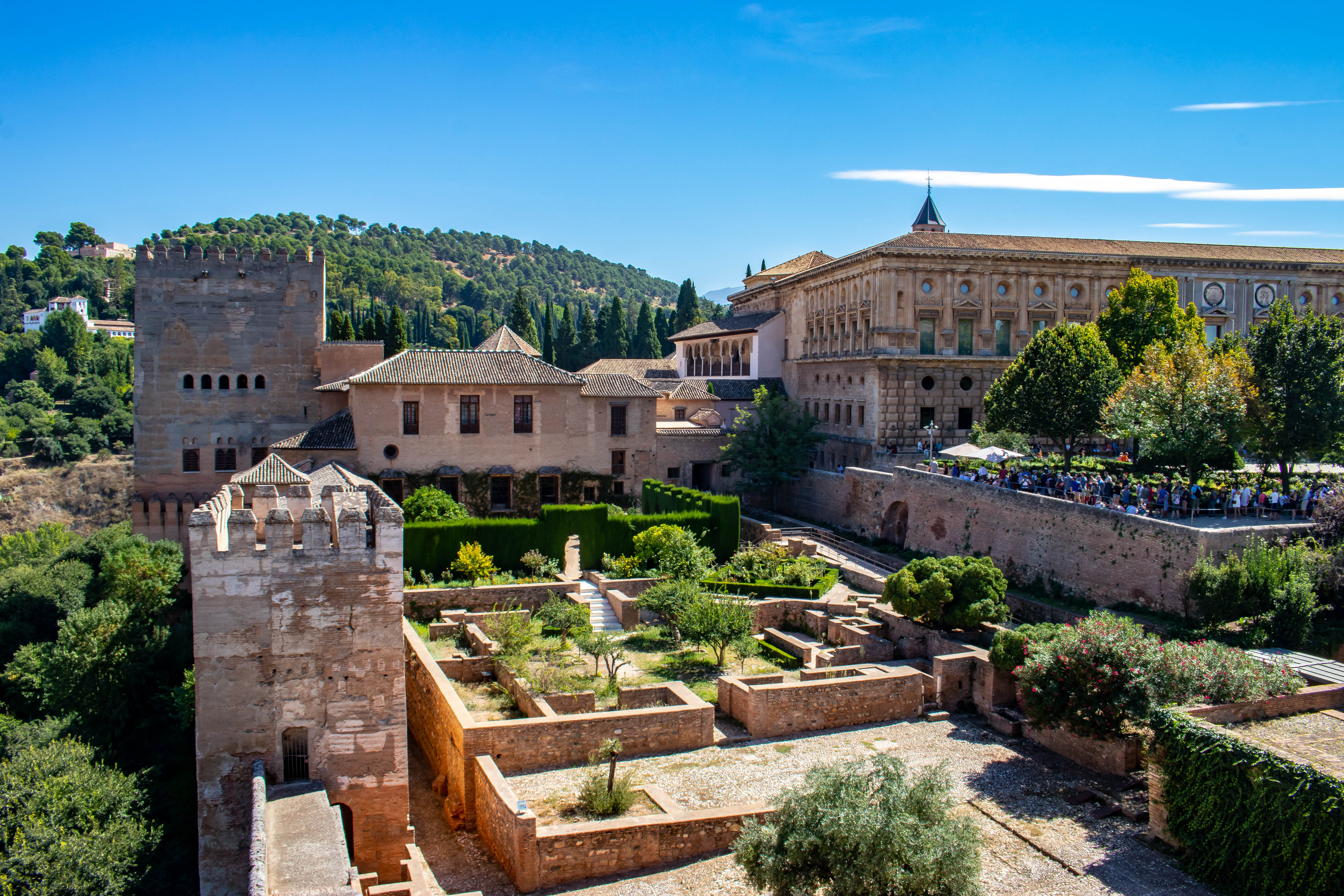
View of the Mexuar today from the west: remains of the two courtyards are visible in front of the Sala del Mexuar (Council Hall) at the back.

Restorations were carried out in the late 19th-century and early 20th century. Among other things, they restored the surviving northern arcade of the Patio de Machuca, though most of the Patio de Machuca and the Patio de la Mezquita are visible only as foundations today, and introduced a connecting doorway between the Council Hall and the oratory. Some of the Christian features added to the Council Hall for its conversion to a chapel were removed during modern restorations, to recover some of the chamber's original appearance. Likewise, many of the post-1492 additions to the Cuarto Dorado area were removed in the 20th century.

== Description ==
The Mexuar generally consists of four main sections or buildings: two consecutive courtyards, a Council Hall (the Sala del Mexuar), and the Cuarto Dorado and its courtyard. The Cuarto Dorado courtyard served as a transition between the Mexuar and the Comares Palace. These components were all aligned along the same axis from west to east.

=== Patio de la Mezquita (first courtyard) ===
Visitors to the Nasrid palace complex entered it from the west and entered into a square courtyard originally known as the "Secondary Mashwar" and now known as the Patio de la Mezquita ('Courtyard of the Mosque' in Spanish). Only the excavated foundations are visible today. Along either side of its central axis was a line of four trees in four planters, a feature unique in Nasrid architecture. The courtyard was surrounded by a series of chambers. According to Ibn al-Khatib's writings, these chambers were used by the sultan's secretaries, which means it was likely here that official documents and records were written and kept. The largest room, on the south side, was likely what Ibn al-Khatib referred to as the Qubbat al-'Ard and may have contained the Dīwān al-Ins͟hā', or Chancery. Its name suggests that there was a dome over part of the room, possibly over the alcove at the back. In the courtyard's southeast corner is a small mosque, with an alignment different from the surrounding structures. The mosque consists of a square chamber which was probably covered by a pyramidal roof, with a square minaret attached to its northwest corner. In a small adjacent room was a fountain used for ablutions. In the middle of the east side of the courtyard was an entrance leading to the second courtyard.

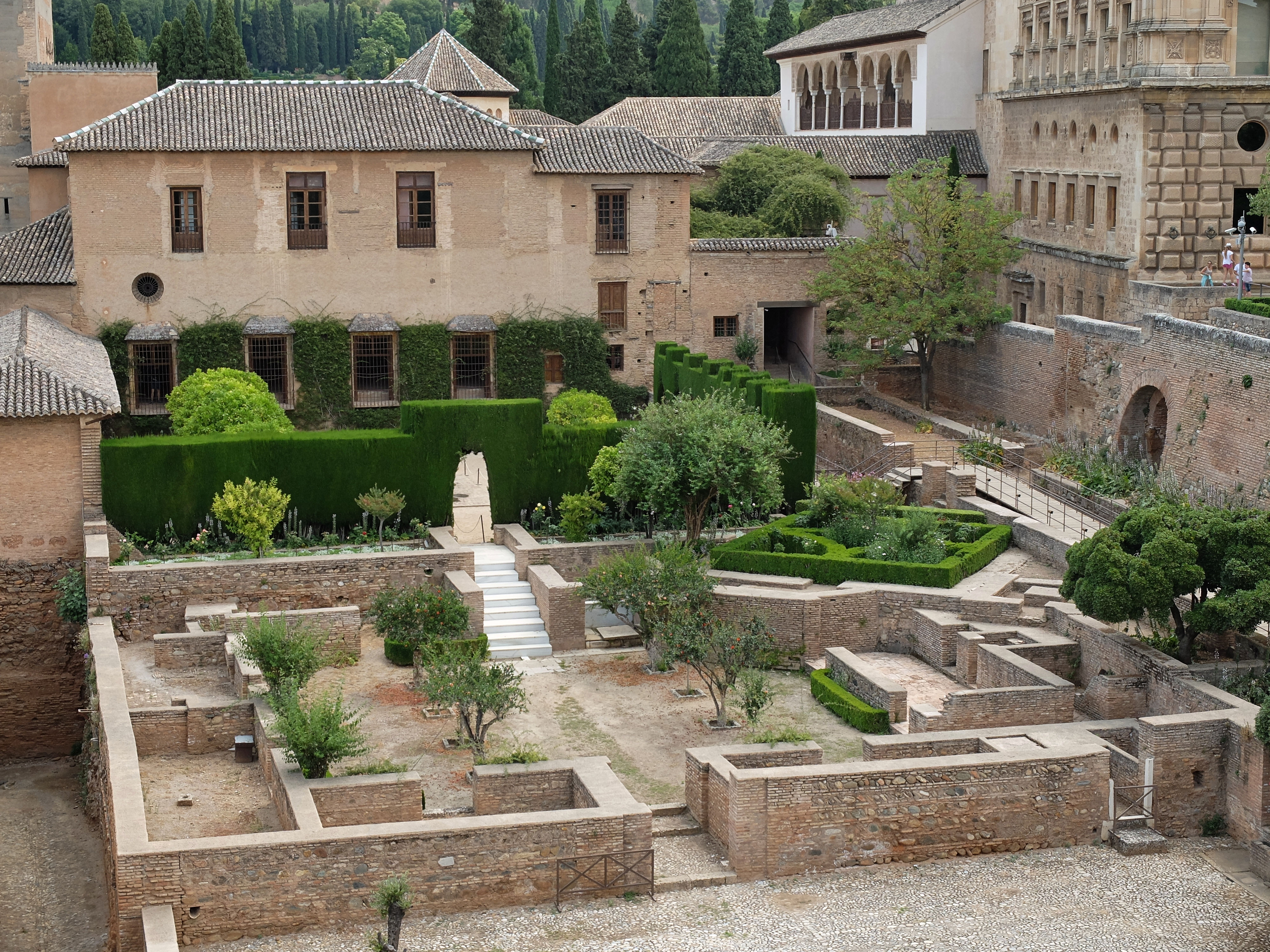
View of the Patio del Mezquita from the west

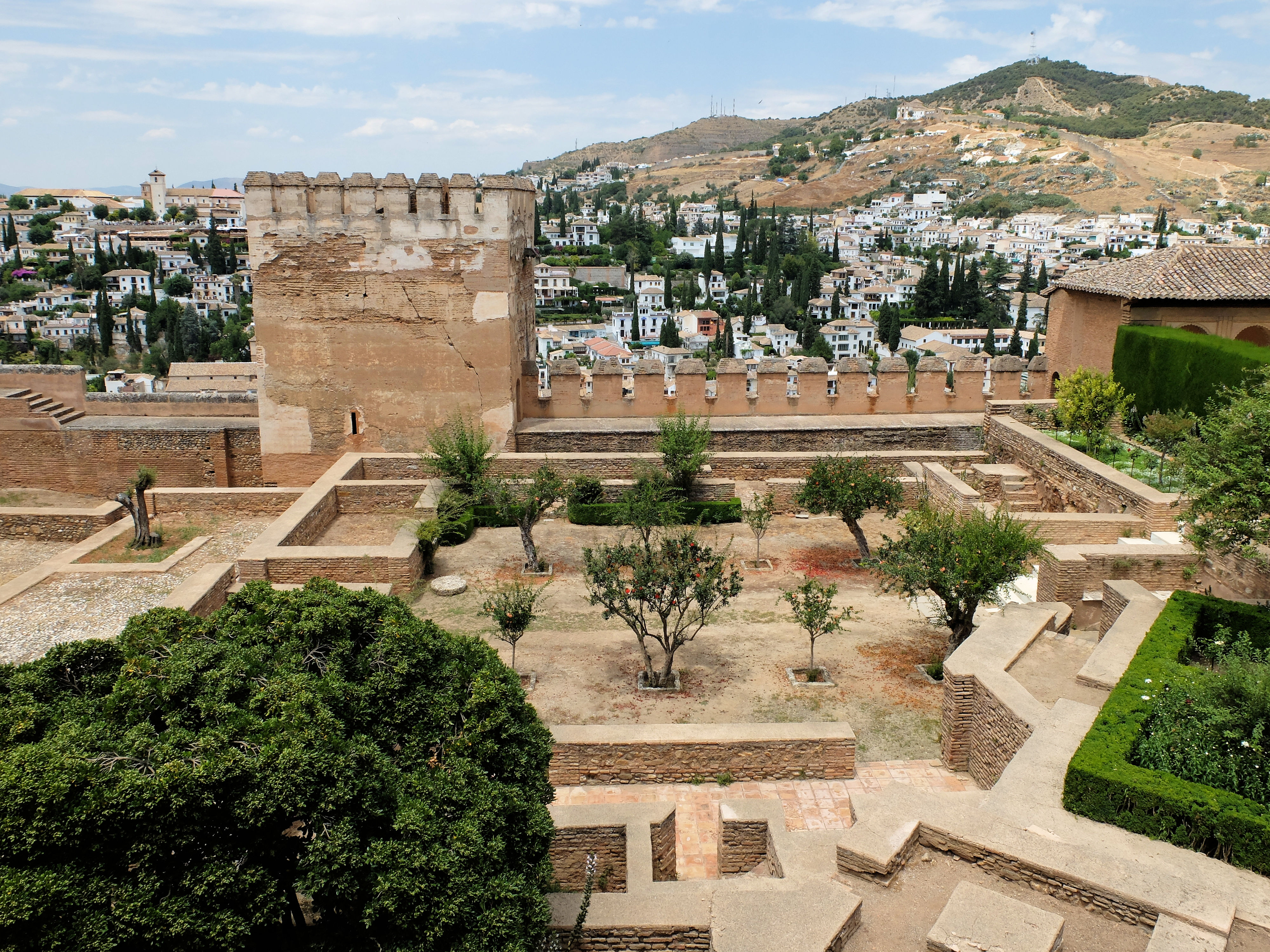
View of the Patio del Mezquita from the south

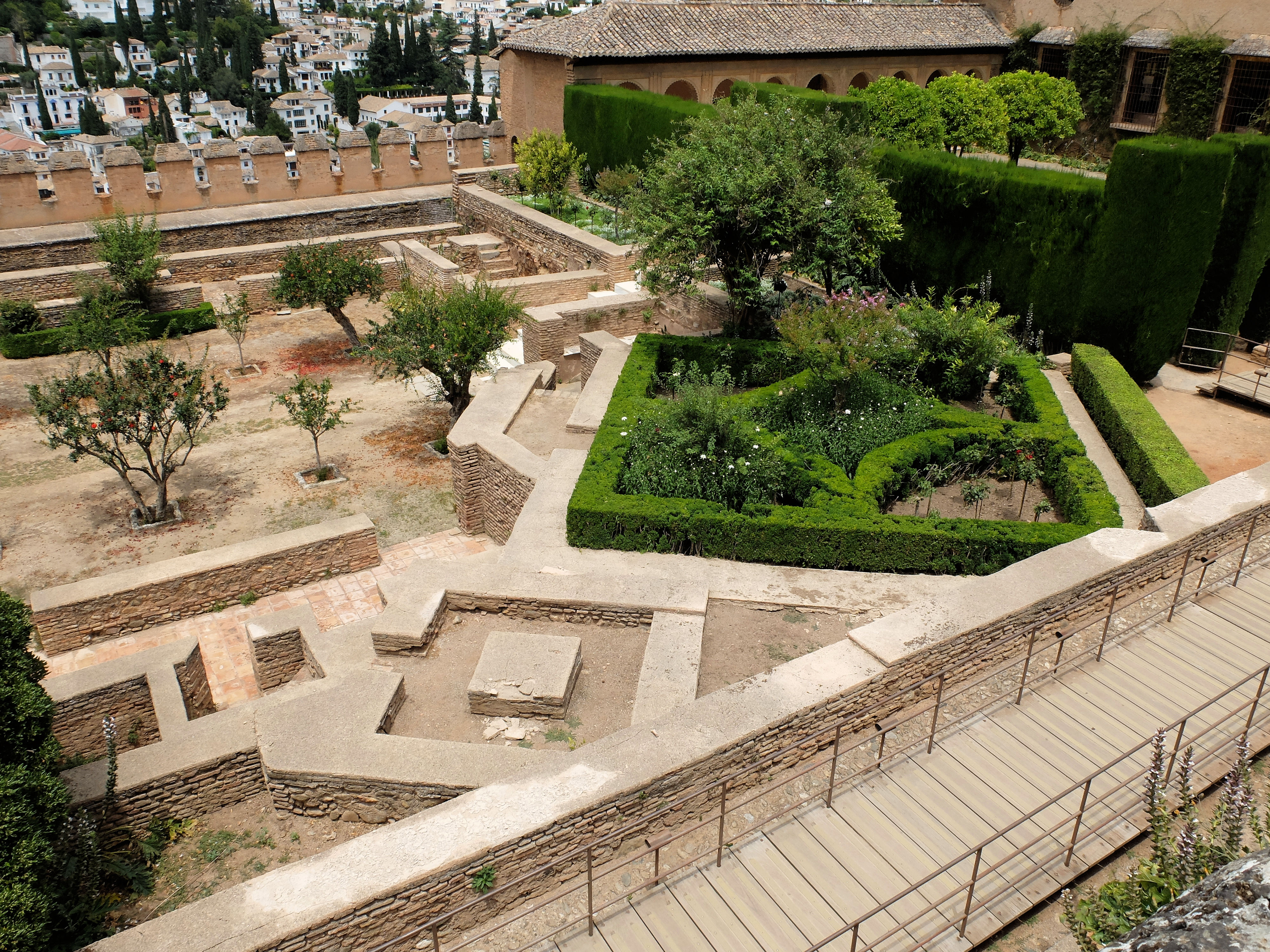
Foundations of the mosque at the southeast corner (now filled by a garden), as well as its minaret (small square structure, lower left)

=== Patio de Machuca (second courtyard) ===
The second courtyard was known as the "Main Mashwar" and is now known as the Patio de Machuca, named after the 16th-century architect Pedro Machuca who resided here while working in the Alhambra. The courtyard was surrounded on three sides (west, north, and south) by a portico. Only the northern portico, which was used as a stable after the Christian conquest, has survived to the present day, after being restored by Leopoldo Torres Balbás in 1926. Lines of trimmed cypress trees now stand in for the southern and western porticos that have disappeared. At the center of the courtyard was an elaborate fountain. Its water basin, still present, is shaped like a rectangle with three semi-circular extensions at either end. Ibn al-Khatib describes that water spilled into the basin from two gilded bronze lion sculptures.

On the north side of the courtyard, behind the portico, is the Torre de Machuca, one of the fortification towers on the Alhambra's northern wall. Sultan Yusuf I converted this tower into the Bahw an-Naṣr ('Mirador of Victory' in Arabic), a square chamber with windows. It seems to have functioned as small alternative throne hall for the sultan (the main throne hall being the Sala del Mexuar). As the room is too small to hold many people, it's likely that during receptions the sultan sat here by himself while his courtiers stood along the portico in front and public guests were received in the courtyard.

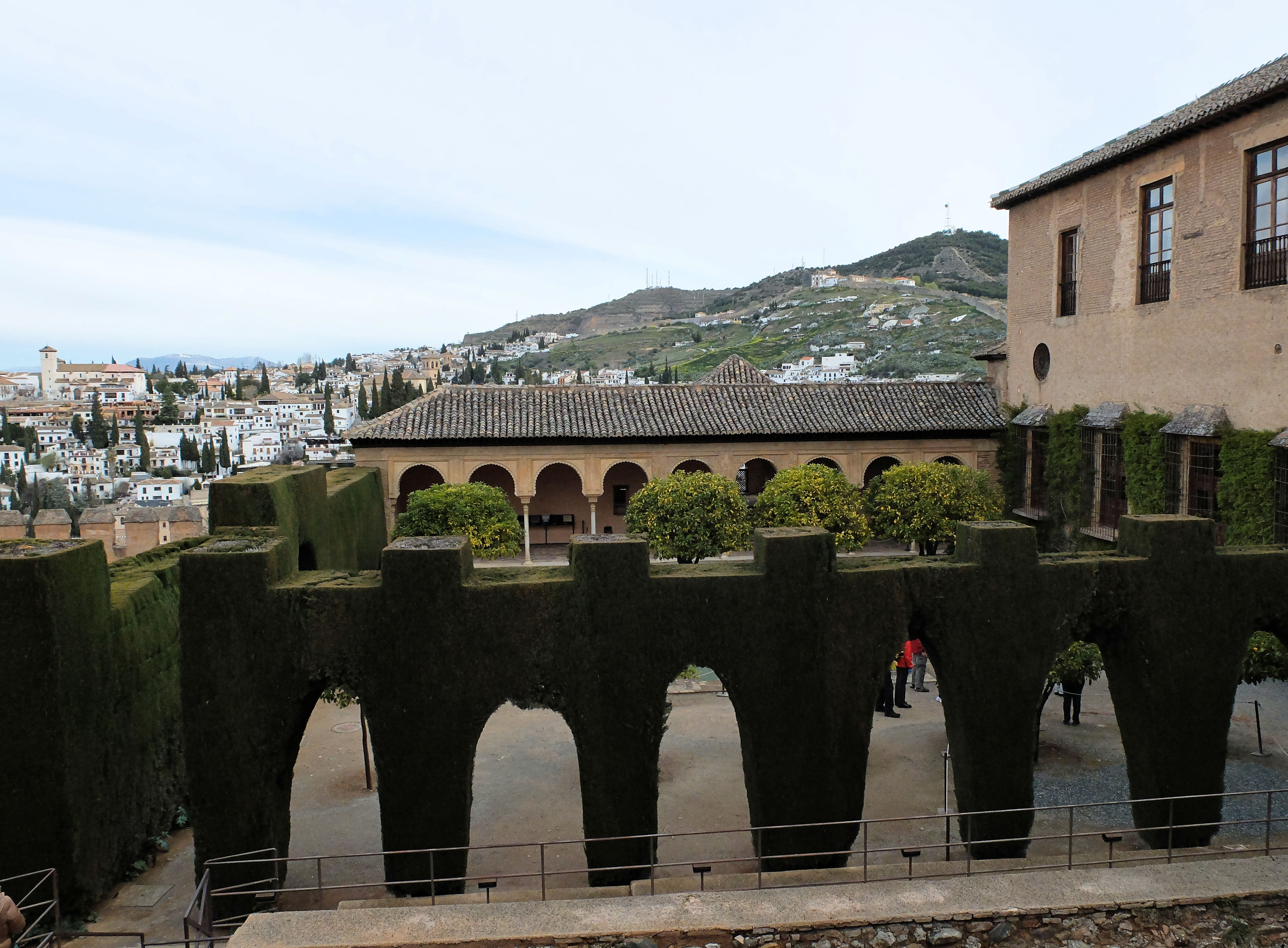
View of the Patio de Machuca from the south (the trimmed cypresses stand in for the lost porticos)

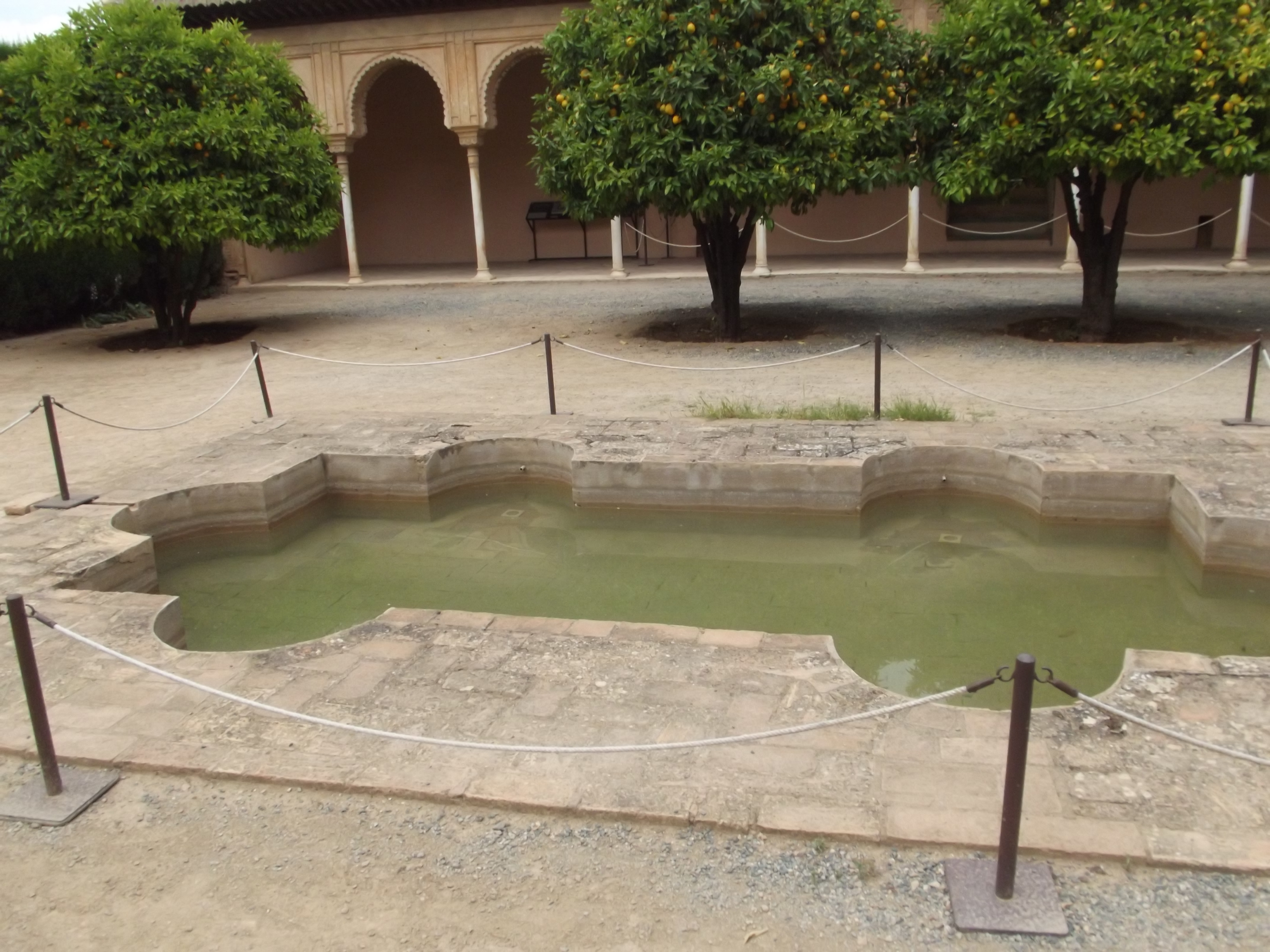
The fountain basin in the Patio de Machuca

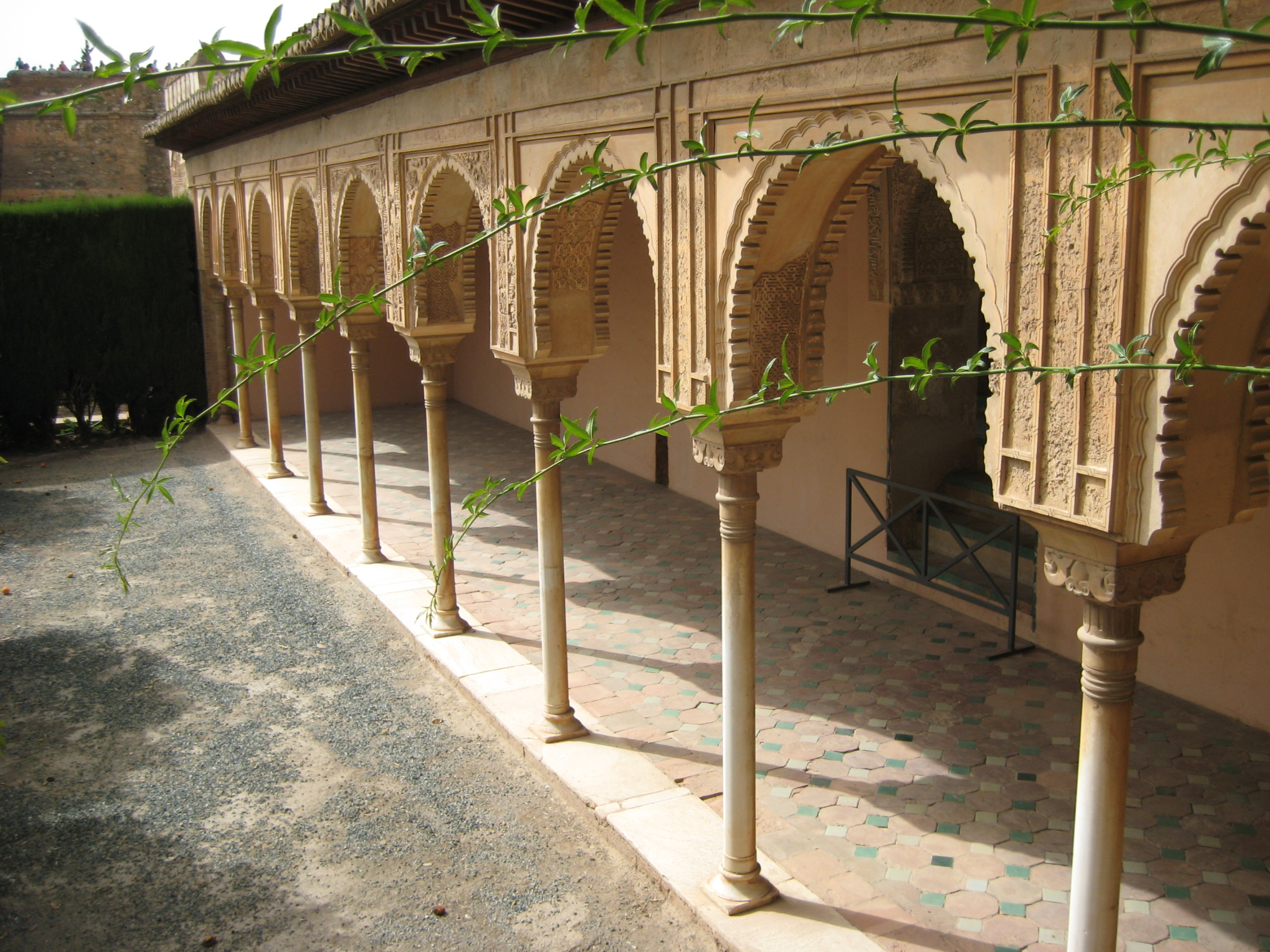
The preserved northern portico of the Patio de Machuca

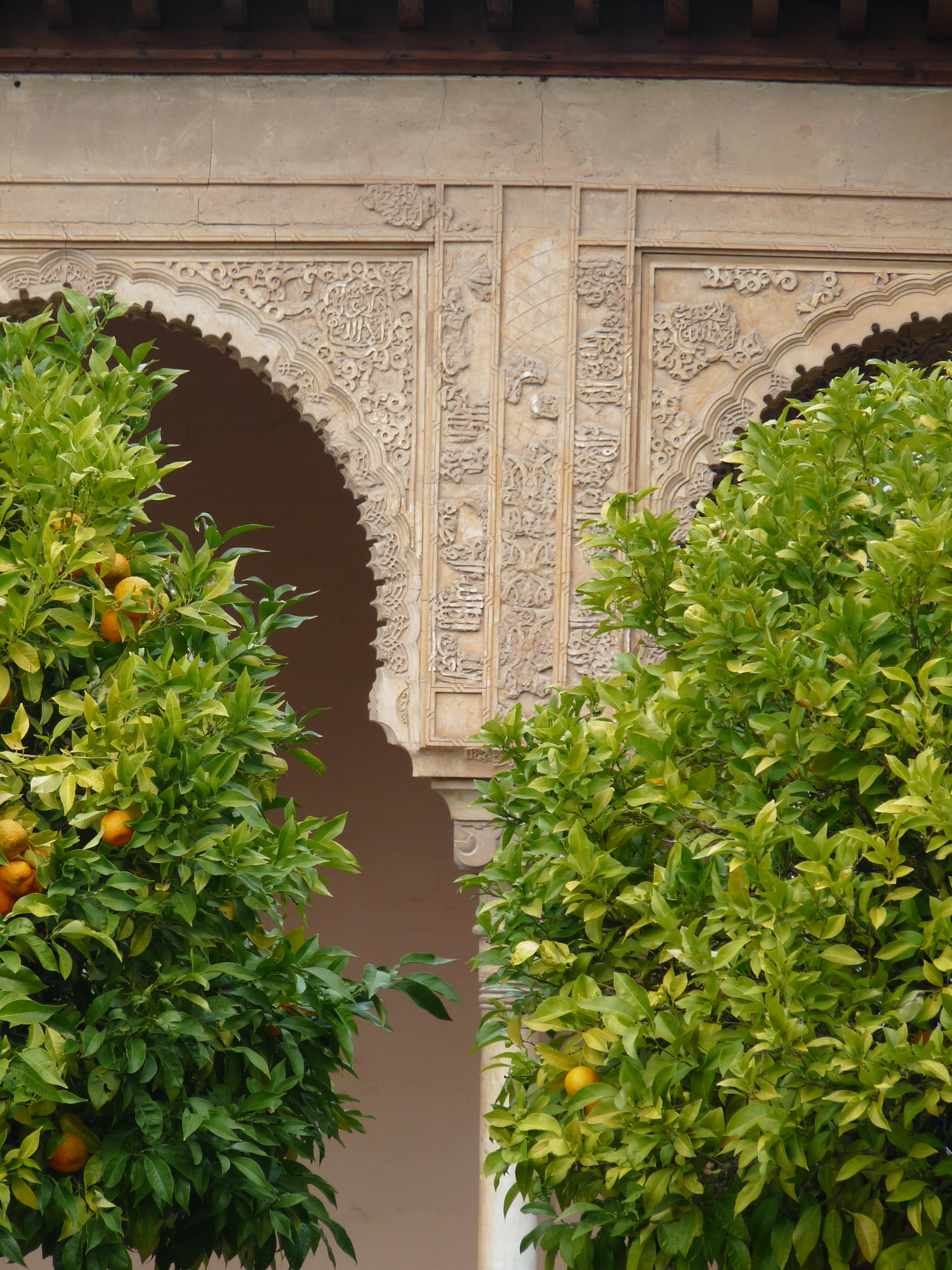
Remains of stucco decoration on the northern portico

=== The oratory ===
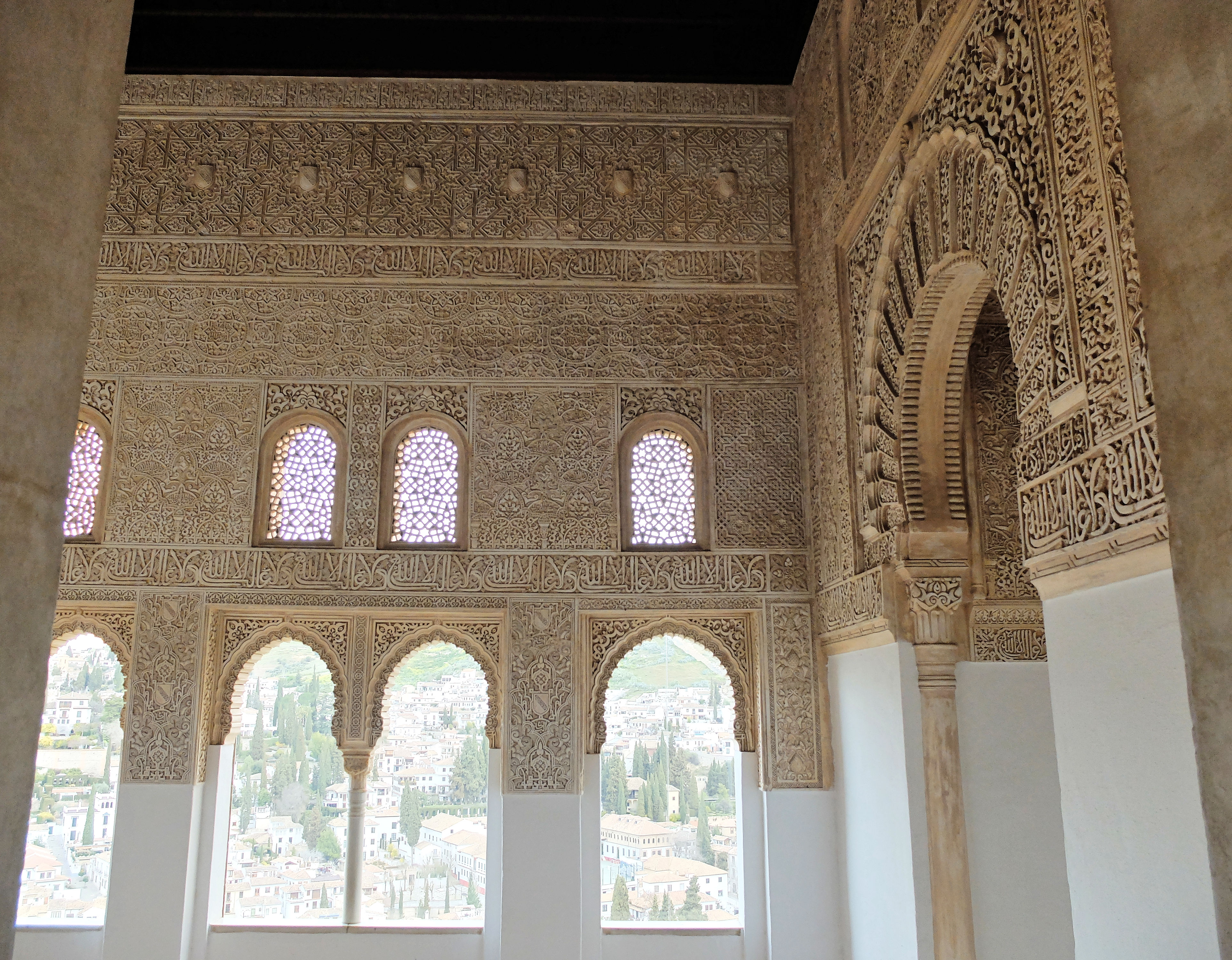
The oratory, with the mihrab on the right

To the east of the Bahw an-Naṣr, and accessible from it, is a private passage that leads to a small oratory on the northeastern edge of the courtyard. This was a private prayer room for the sultan, equipped with a mihrab and with double-arched windows offering views onto the landscape and the city below, similar to the oratory of the Partal Palace. The mihrab and the walls of the chamber are decorated with carved stucco with arabesque motifs. An inscription on the mihrab includes an excerpt of verse 205 of the seventh surah of the Qur'an. During restorations to the Alhambra between 1868 and 1889 the oratory was incorporated into the Sala del Mexuar by knocking down a part of the wall to create a doorway between them. The floor of the oratory was also lowered from its original level to accommodate this connection – as evidenced by the elevated ledge below the windows and at the base of the mihrab. The room was restored again in 1917.

=== Sala del Mexuar (Council Hall) ===
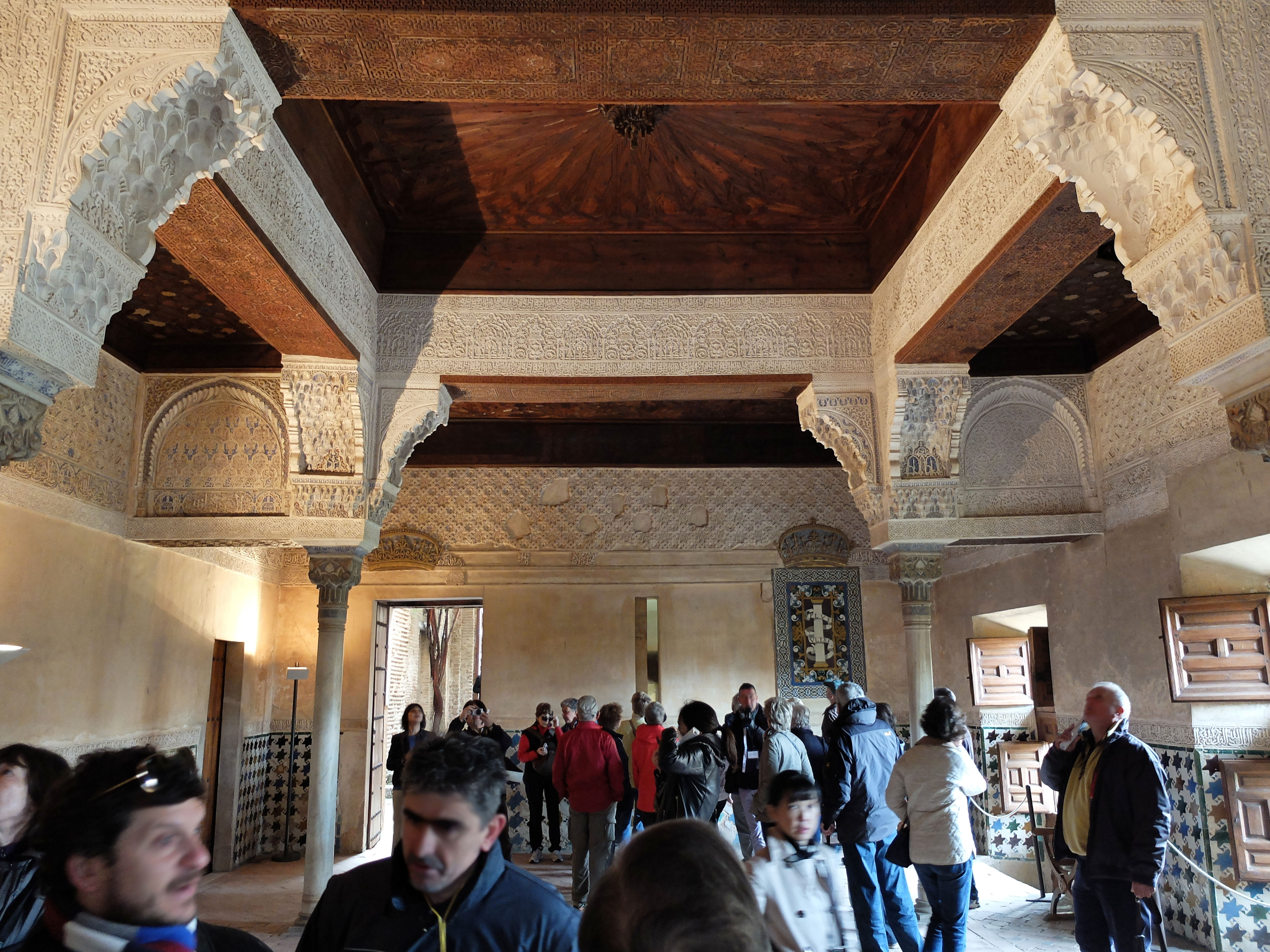
Sala del Mexuar (Council Hall), looking south

The hall to the east of the Patio de Machuca was known in Arabic as the Majlis al-Qu'ūd ('Council Hall') and known in Spanish today as the Sala del Mexuar. It served as an audience chamber and throne hall for the sultan – at least during some periods – when he was receiving petitions from the public. It's likely that members of the public did not enter the hall itself and had to remain in the courtyards. Instead, their petitions were written down and then brought here to the sultan by court officials. The sultan then deliberated and passed judgement.

The hall's floor is higher than the level of the courtyard and it was originally accessed from the latter via three tall steps leading to a doorway, on the west side of the hall. This entrance, along with the steps, were suppressed and walled off when the hall was converted into a Christian chapel in the 16th century. Another entrance, now used by visitors, is located on the south side and likely dates from the remodeling of Muhammad V. This doorway of this entrance is surrounded by stucco decoration and surmounted by an ornate wooden eave, but the tilework of its lower walls has been lost. This passageway originally connected the Council Hall with another large chamber to the south. The central part of this chamber was covered by a dome supported on L-shaped pillars. This hall functioned as a treasury and pay office. It was also accessible directly from the Patio de Machuca and from the western door of the Comares Façade in the Cuarto Dorado courtyard.

The design of the Council Hall is unusual compared in Andalusi palace architecture, but has parallels with Mamluk throne halls in the Middle East and possibly with the throne hall of the 11th-century Qal'at Bani Hammad in present-day Algeria. Inside the rectangular hall is a central square space delineated by four columns supporting the ceiling. It's likely that this square central space was originally covered by a dome with a lantern that had coloured glass windows, perhaps similar to the coloured glass vault in the Mirador de Lindaraja (in the Palace of the Lions). Arabic sources referred to the dome as the Qubba al-'Ulyā ('High Dome'). The sultan's throne was likely placed on a carpet under this dome. The dome was dismantled around 1540 to create upper-floor room. The walls around the room are decorated with carved stucco and with tilework. The columns in the center uphold a consoles with stucco muqarnas that uphold the wooden ceiling. The Nasrid capitals of the marble columns retain their original polychromatic (colour) decoration. While the wooden ceiling in the center dates from a later era, the wooden ceilings around this edges have preserved their original designs with geometric patterns. The window shutters date from the 16th century when the conversion to a chapel occurred.

On the north side of the hall is another rectangular space that was originally a separate hall that was joined to the main hall during its conversion into a chapel. A wooden gallery above this space was then added (whose railing is still visible today) and served as the choir. The walls of this back area are decorated with mosaic tilework (zellij) that was reused and brought here from other parts of the palace. The mosaics form star-shaped geometric patterns with emblems at their center. The emblems visible today include the Nasrid motto (Arabic: ولا غالب إلا الله, lit. 'And there is no victor but God') as well as the double-headed eagle and coat of arms of the later Christian governors of the Alhambra.

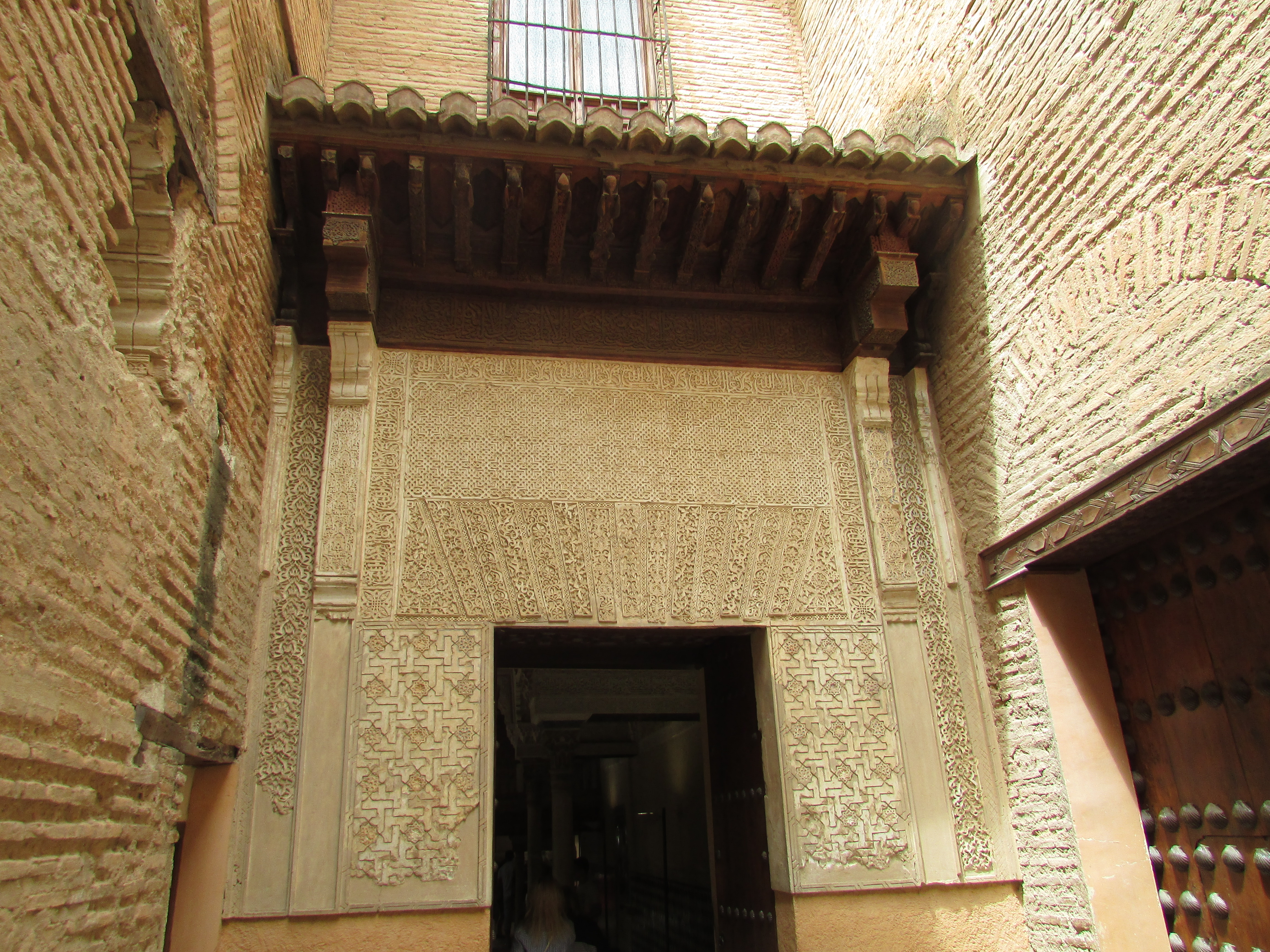
The southern entrance into the Sala del Mexuar, used by visitors today

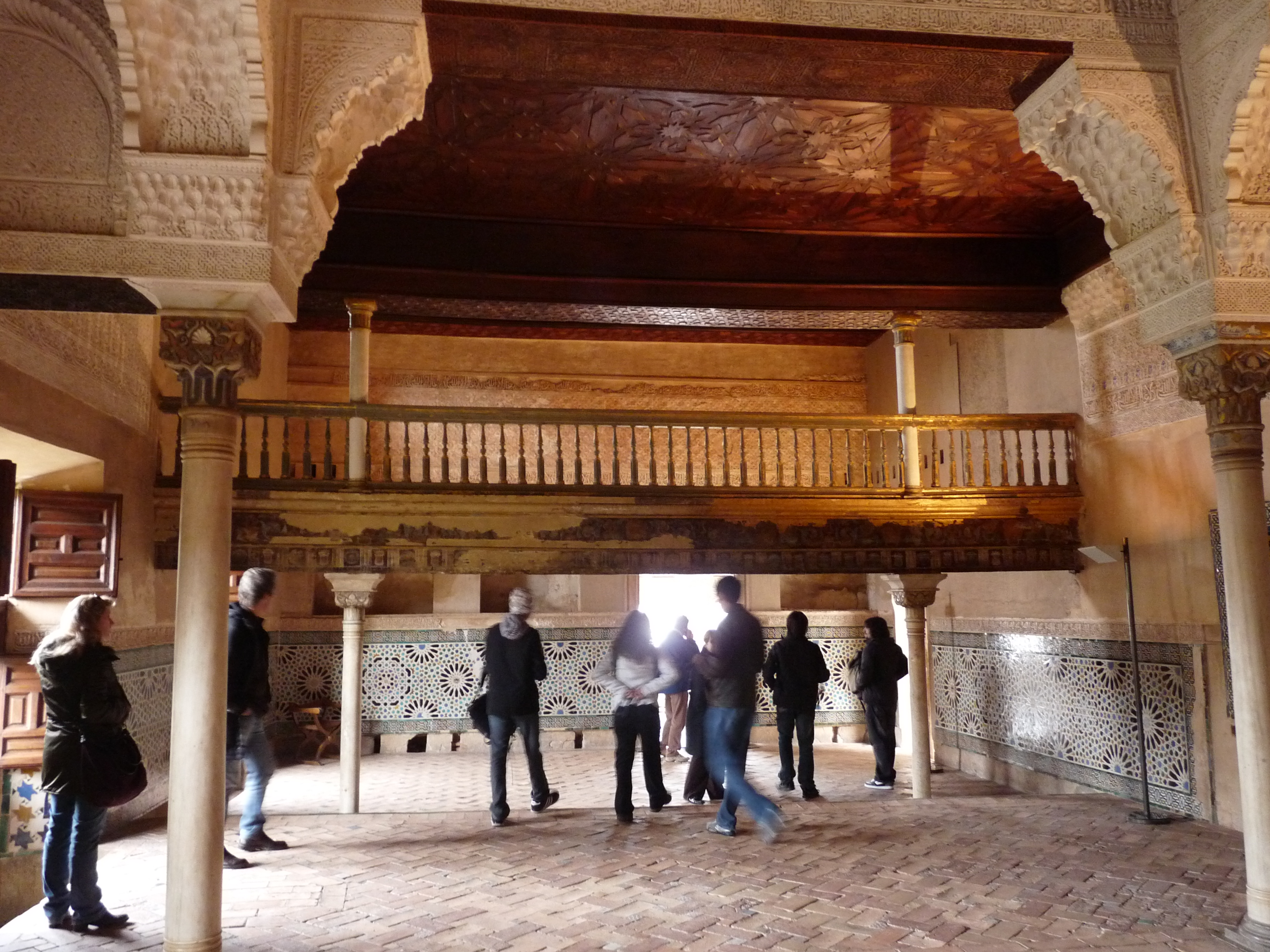
Sala del Mexuar, looking north to the annexed chamber and former choir at the back of the hall

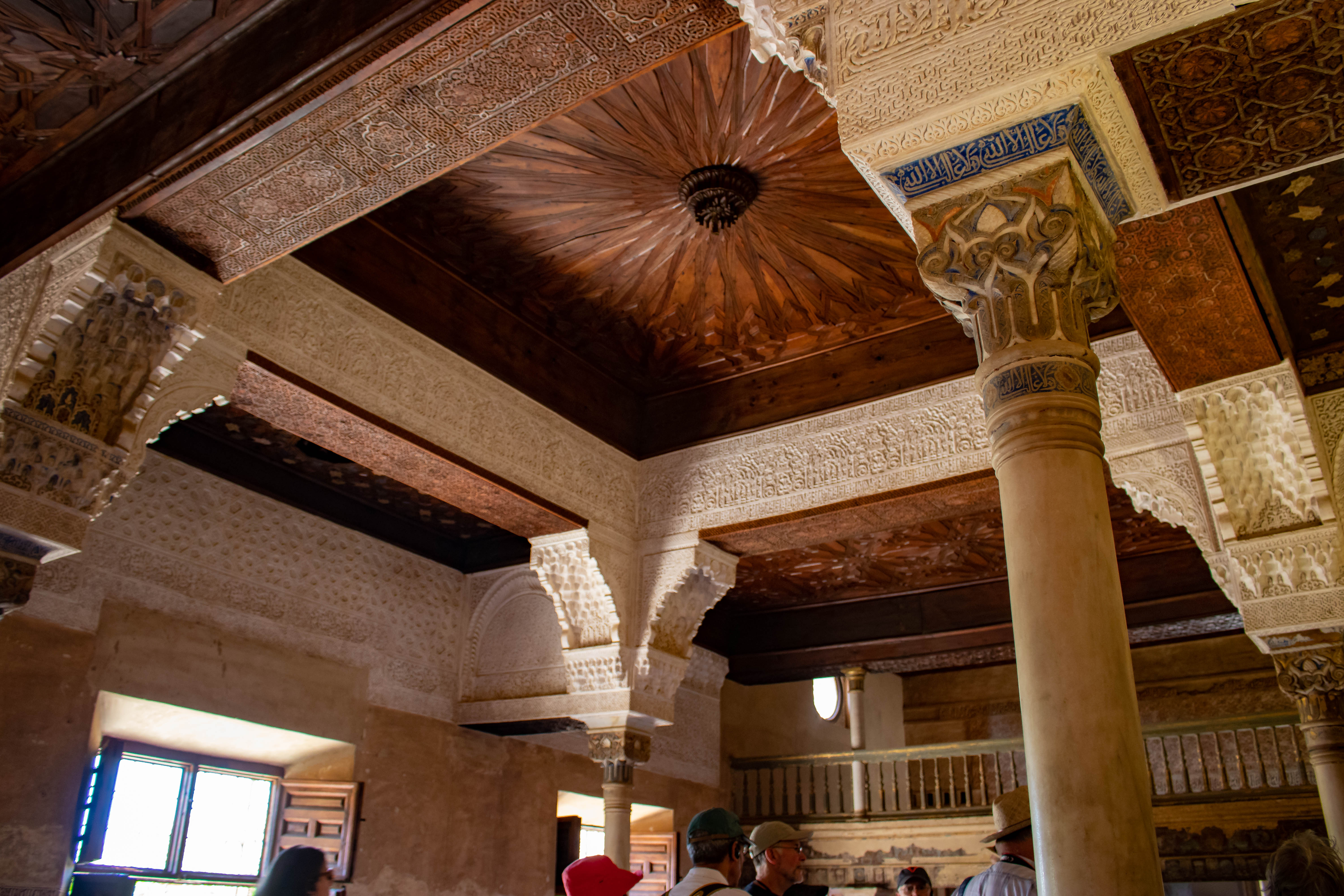
Central ceiling of the hall, which was probably covered by a dome in the Nasrid period

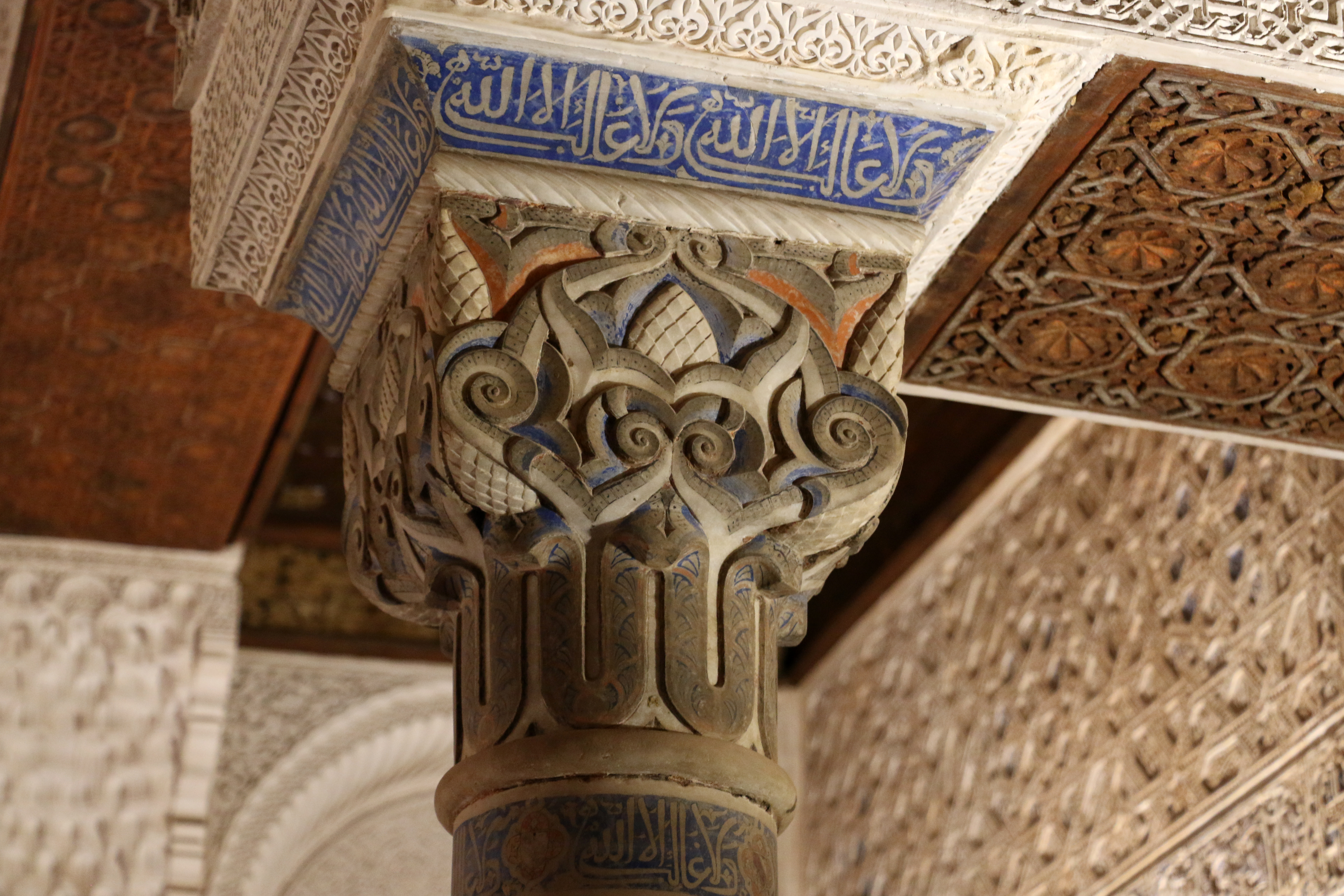
Nasrid capital with preserved polychrome decoration

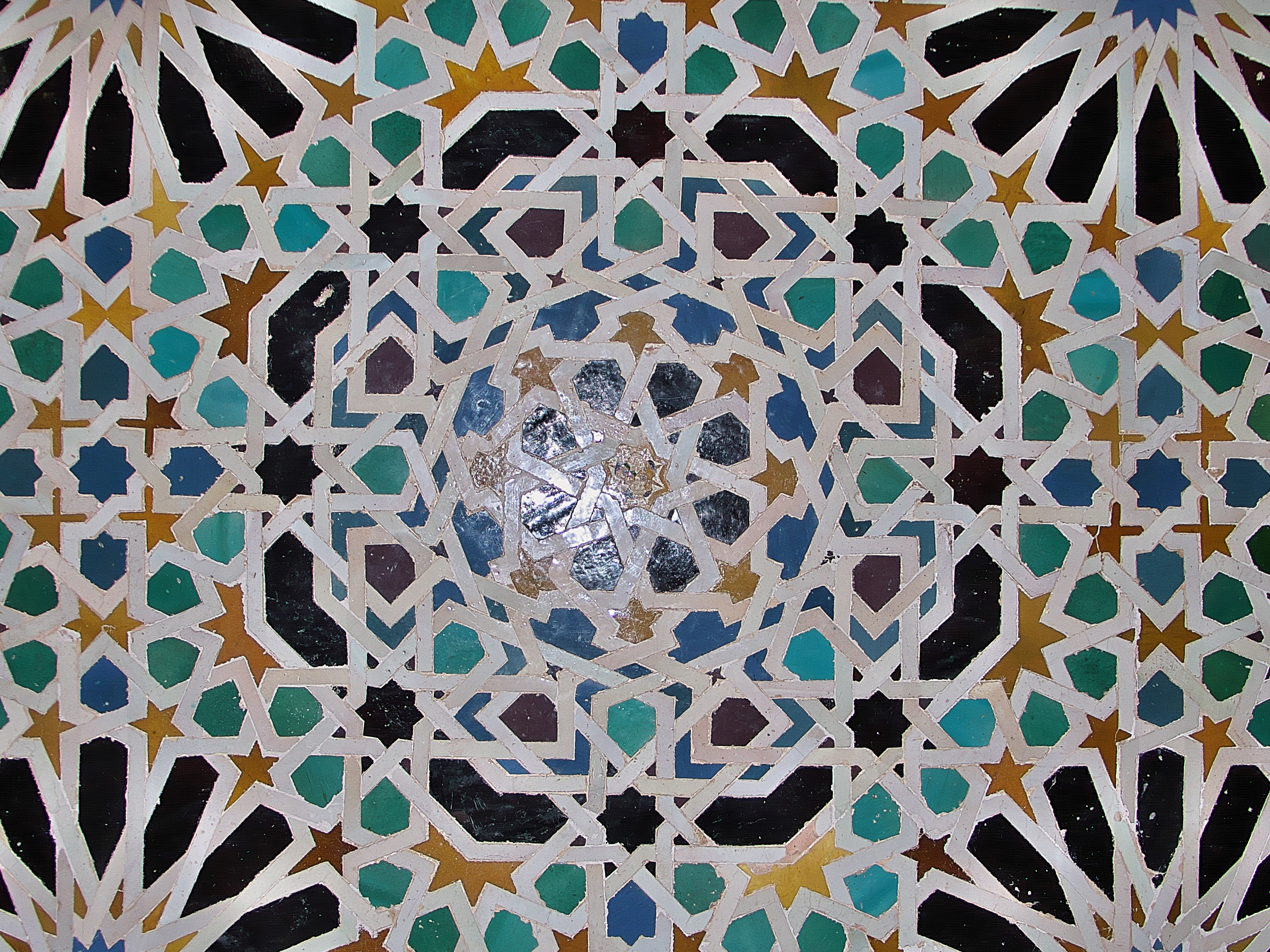
Mosaic tilework (zellij) in the hall

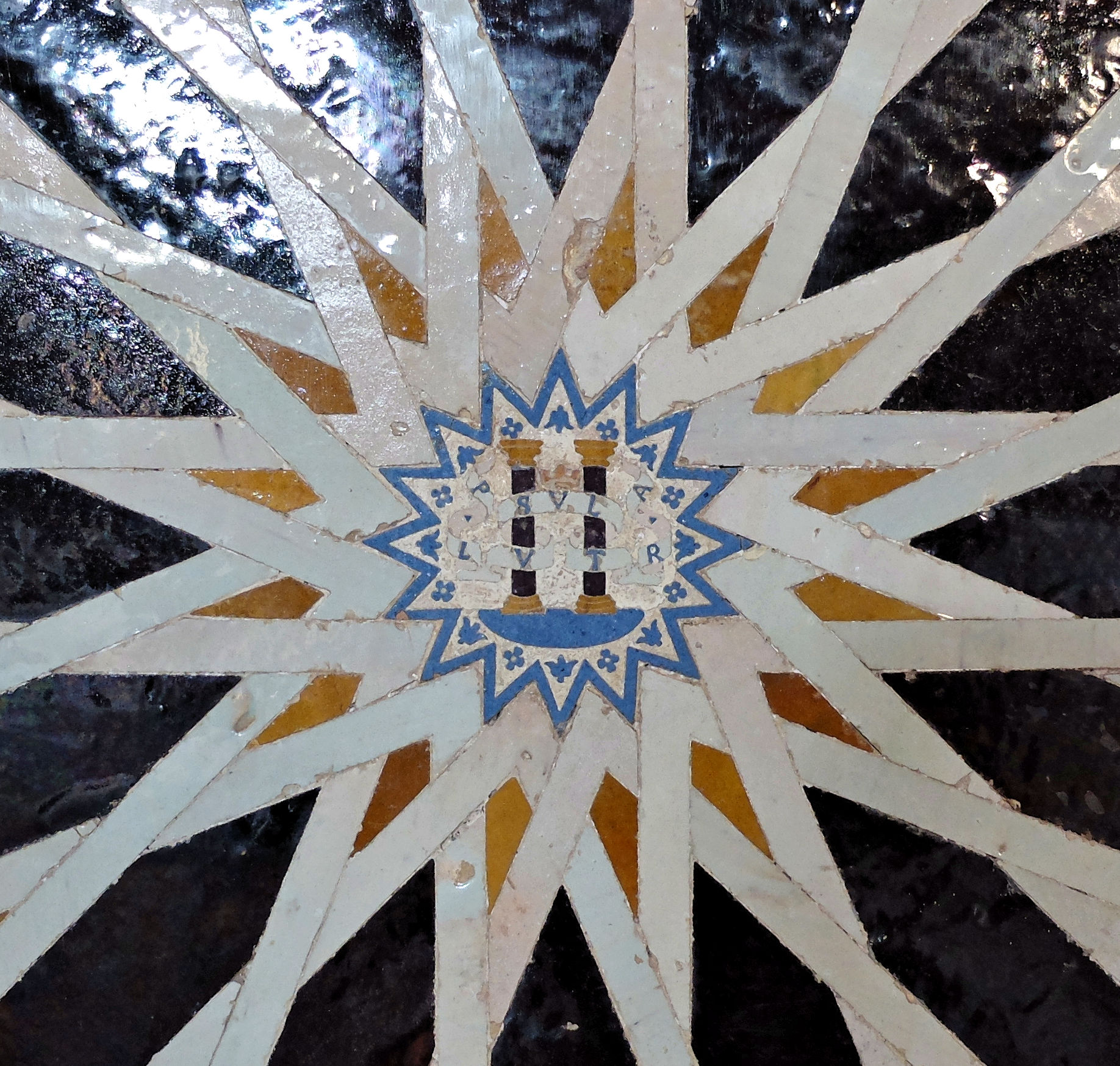
Plus Ultra, an emblem of Charles V from the 16th century, inserted among the tiles

=== Cuarto Dorado ===
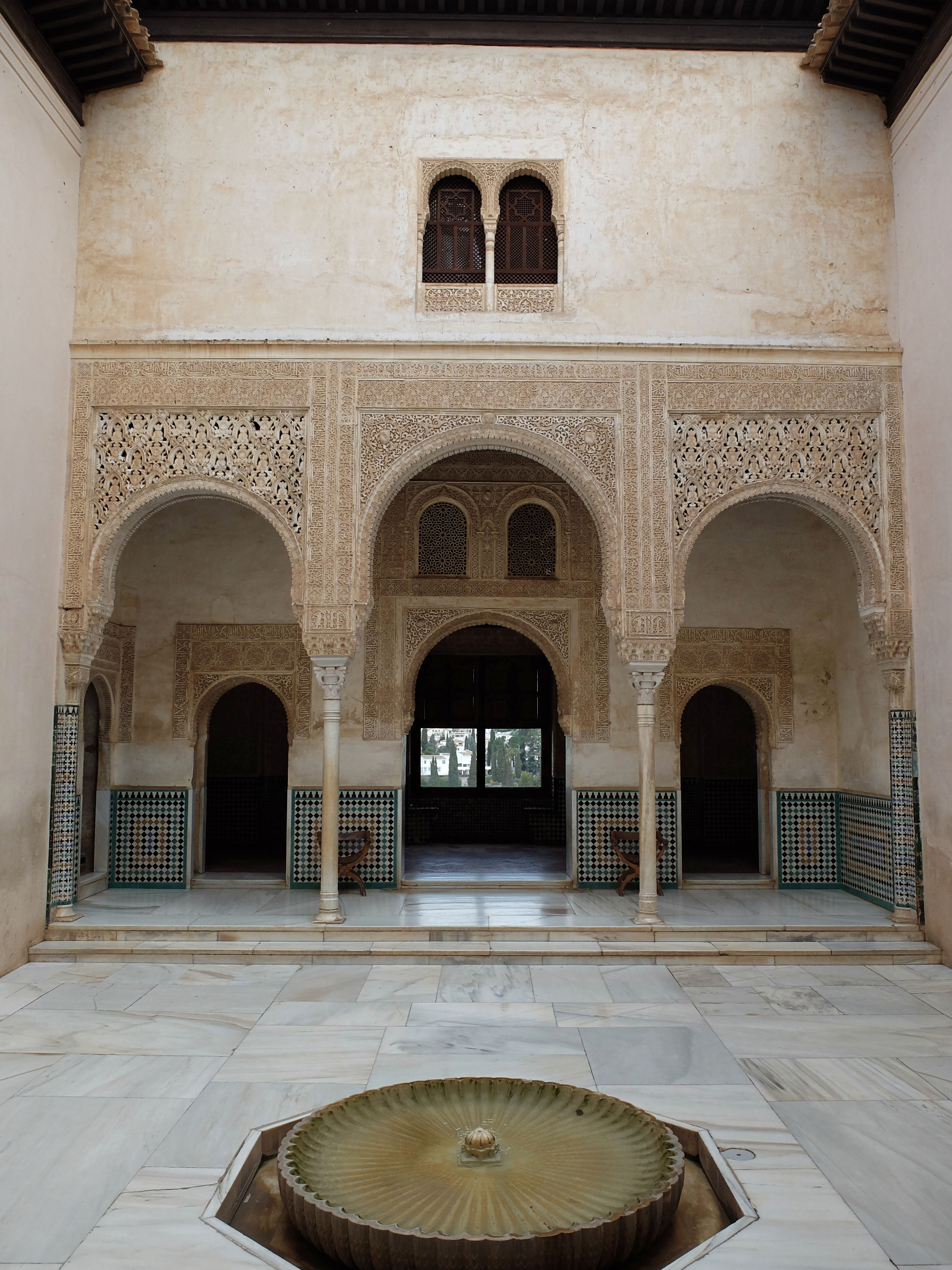
Patio del Cuarto Dorado, looking north towards the portico

To the east of the Council Hall, accessed by a narrow passage, is a small courtyard known as the Patio del Cuarto Dorado ('Courtyard of the Golden Room' or 'Courtyard of the Gilded Room'). The north side of this courtyard is occupied by a portico that precedes a hall, the Cuarto Dorado ('Golden Room'), while the south side is taken up by the Comares Façade, a highly decorated wall façade with two doors, one of which grants access to the Comares Palace to the east. Scholar Arnold Felix has noted that the courtyard is like a "miniature palace", with all the elements of a typical Nasrid courtyard palace condensed into a smaller space.

The Cuarto Dorado may have served as a waiting room for visitors about to enter the Comares Palace. The entrance passage to the courtyard may have been narrow in order make it easier for guards to control who entered this space. At the end of the 15th century, after the Christian conquest, the north portico was partially obscured by the addition of a large horseshoe arch in front of it, which was dismantled in 1965. Likewise, an upper-floor wooden gallery and upper chambers were added at some point after this before eventually being dismantled in the early 20th century. These additions were made to convert this space into a residence. A well-known drawing by J.F. Lewis in 1835 illustrates the state of the courtyard before modern restorations began.

The marble basin and fountain at the center of the courtyard is a replica of an original Nasrid fountain basin that was found in the Lindaraja Courtyard, moved there from its original context, and now kept in the Alhambra Museum. The portico on the north side consists of three arches, of which the central arch is larger than the two others. The arches are decorated with carved stucco and supported by slender marble columns, much of which is still original. The capitals of the columns have older Almohad-like designs instead of the usual Nasrid designs. A barred opening in the east wall next to the portico provides light to an underground passage that was used by Nasrid guards to move around the palace.

The Cuarto Dorado hall behind the portico is accessible through three decorated archways, of which the central one is again larger than the others and surmounted by two windows. The hall itself is an elongated rectangular space covered by a vaulted wooden ceiling with geometric motifs. In 1499, after the Christian conquest, this ceiling was painted and gilded with ornamental motifs by Juan Caxto and Jorge Fernández, which gave the hall its current name. The golden motifs include emblems of the Catholic Monarchs and other heraldic motifs. Along the back wall of the chamber there were probably three windows originally, but after the Christian conquest the two side windows were walled up (visible now only as niches in the wall) and the central window was transformed into a small balcony with benches and a double-arched window with views onto the city below.

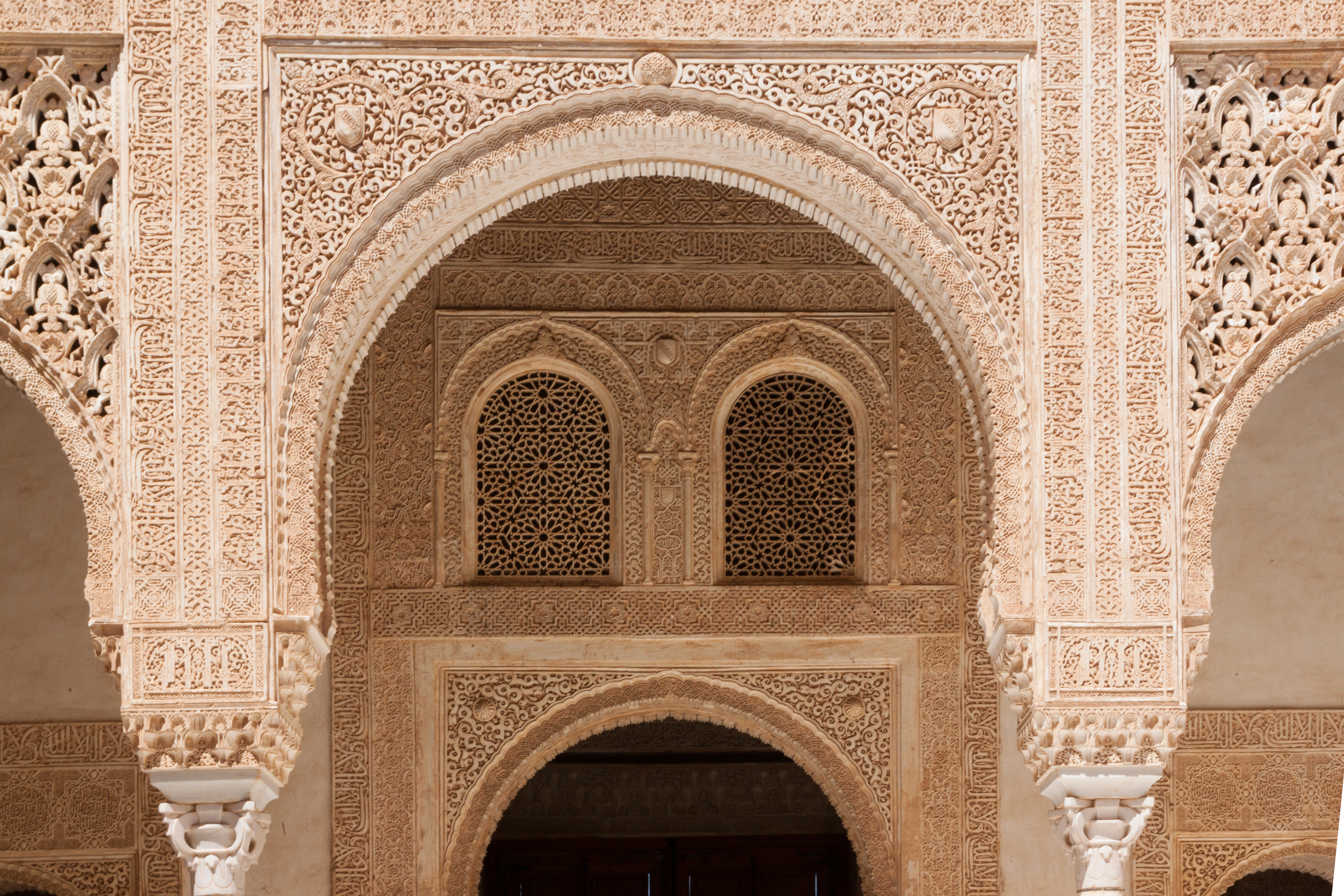
Marble capitals and stucco decoration of the portico and the doorways behind it

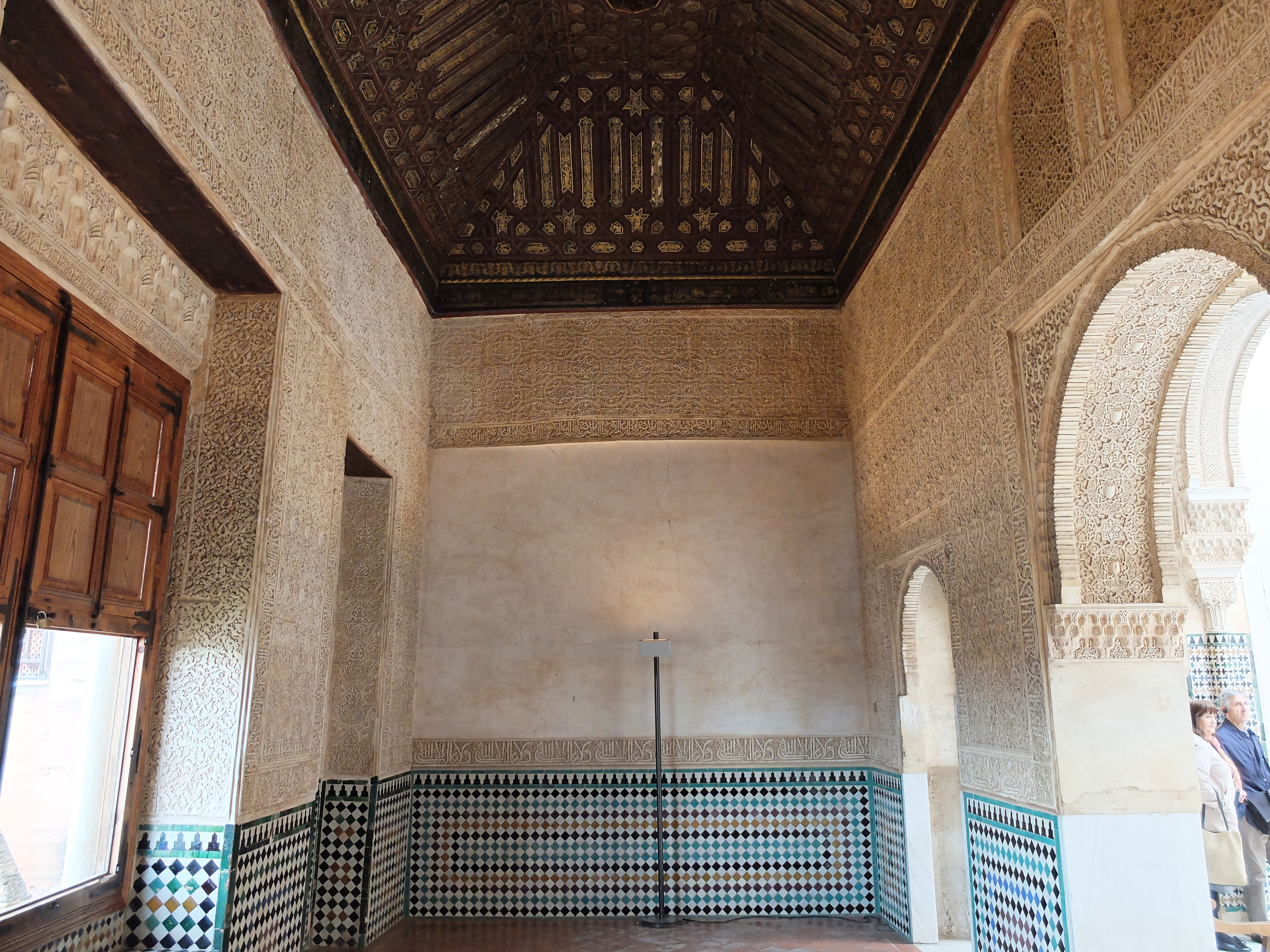
Interior of the Cuarto Dorado

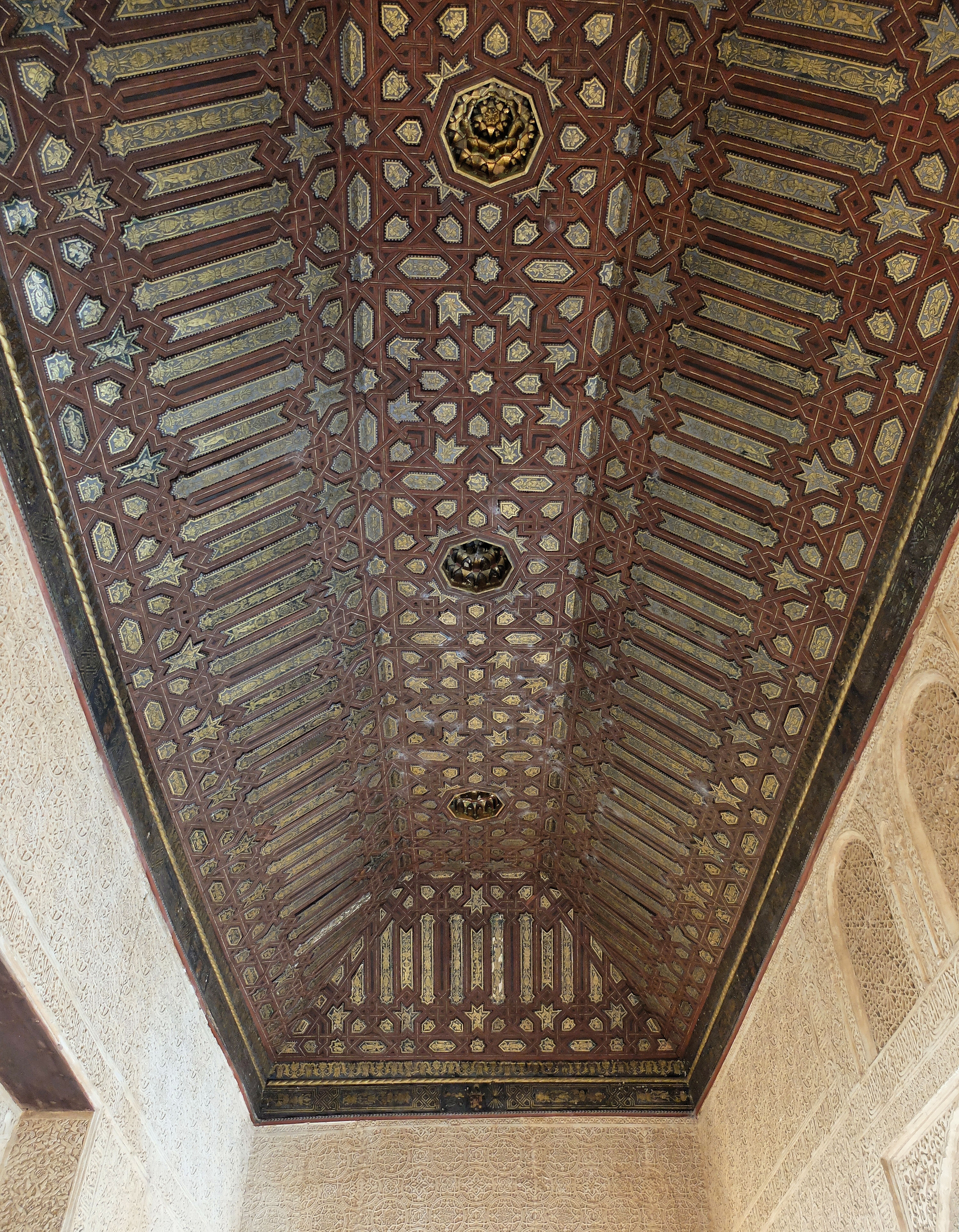
Ceiling of the Cuarto Dorado

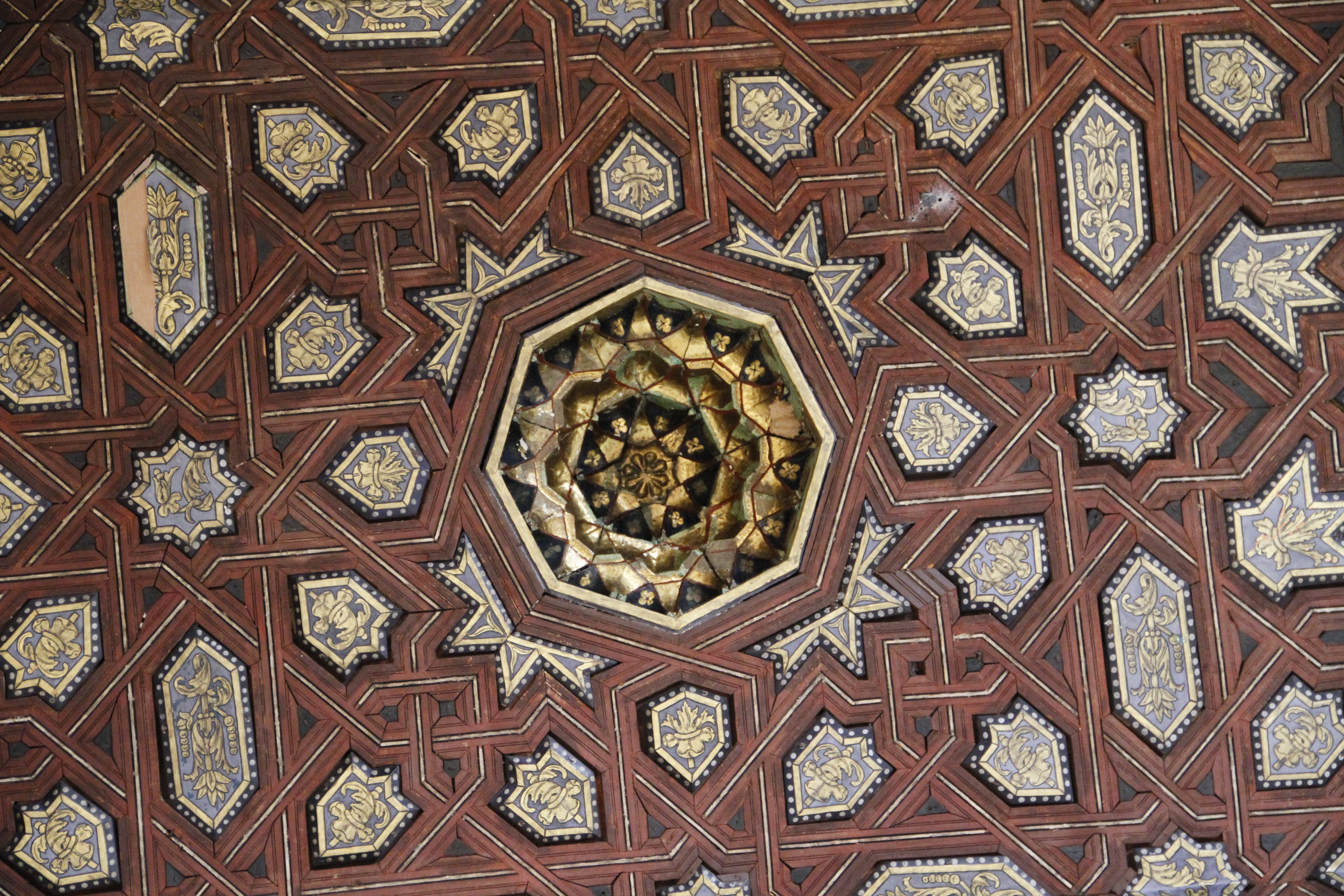
Close-up of the geometric designs and the added gilded motifs of the ceiling

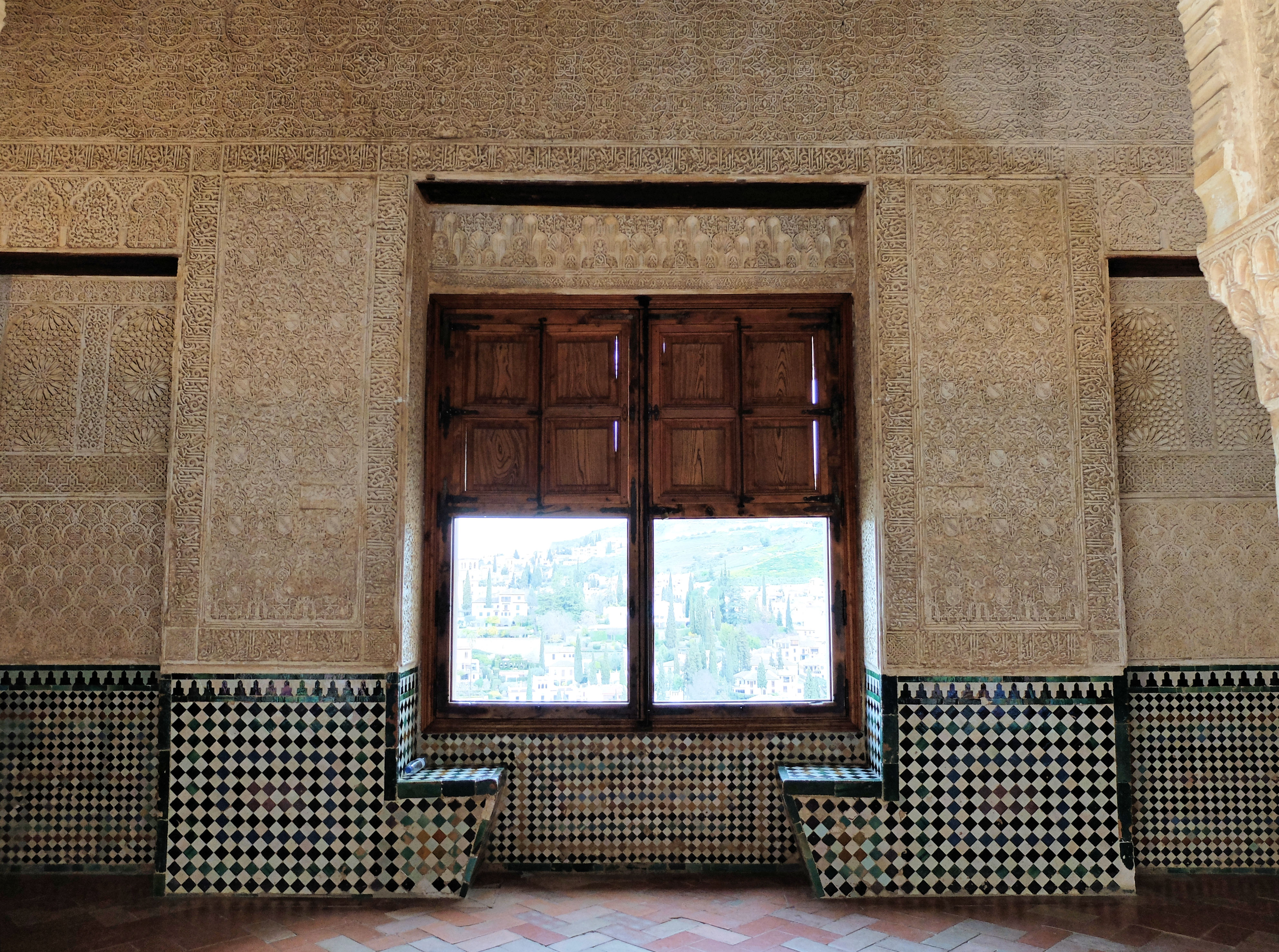
The central window/balcony of the chamber

==== The Comares Façade ====
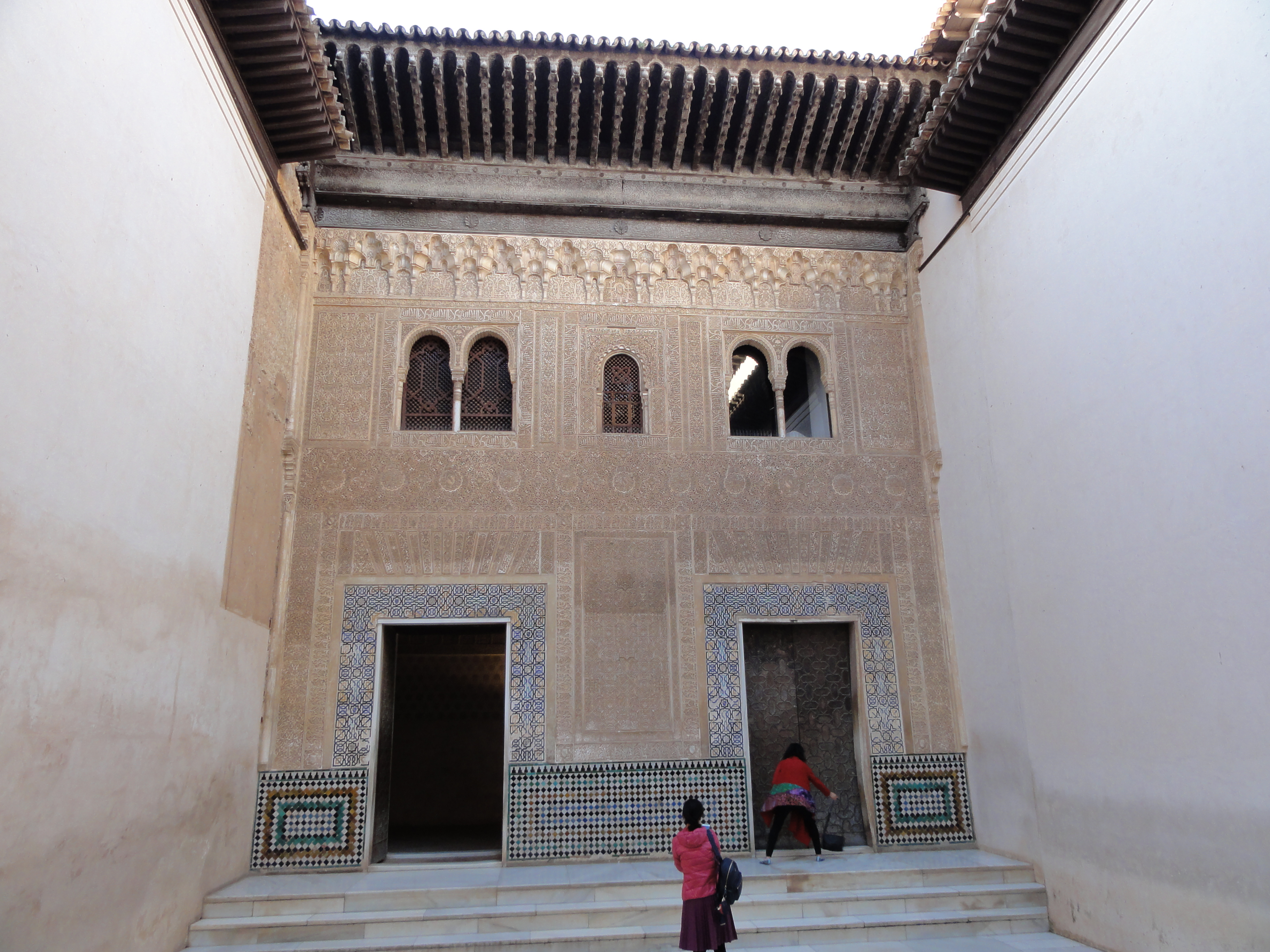
The Comares Façade on the south side of the Patio del Cuarto Dorado

The monumental, richly decorated southern façade of the Cuarto Dorado courtyard has been interpreted as the "façade" of the Comares Palace and is known as the Comares Façade or Façade of the Comares Palace. This façade dates from the time of Muhammad V. It has two identical doors, with the left (eastern) door leading via a winding passage to the Court of the Myrtles and the right door leading to other private chambers, including the treasury (mentioned above) connected to the rest of the Mexuar. The façade is one of the most heavily decorated walls in the Alhambra, covered in stucco decoration for most of its surface except for tile decoration along the lower portions (some of which comes from modern restorations). The carved stucco includes an Arabic inscription featuring a poem by Ibn Zamrak (d. 1393) and the Throne Verse of the Qur'an (2:255), which may indicate that this area was sometimes used by the sultan to hold audiences or other ceremonies. Above the doors are two double-arched windows and one single-arched window between them. Above these is a muqarnas cornice that precedes a wide wooden eave, which in turn would have sheltered the seat of the sultan at the top of the courtyard steps.
