= Museum of Islamic Art, Berlin =

Museum in Berlin, Germany

Museum für Islamische Kunst
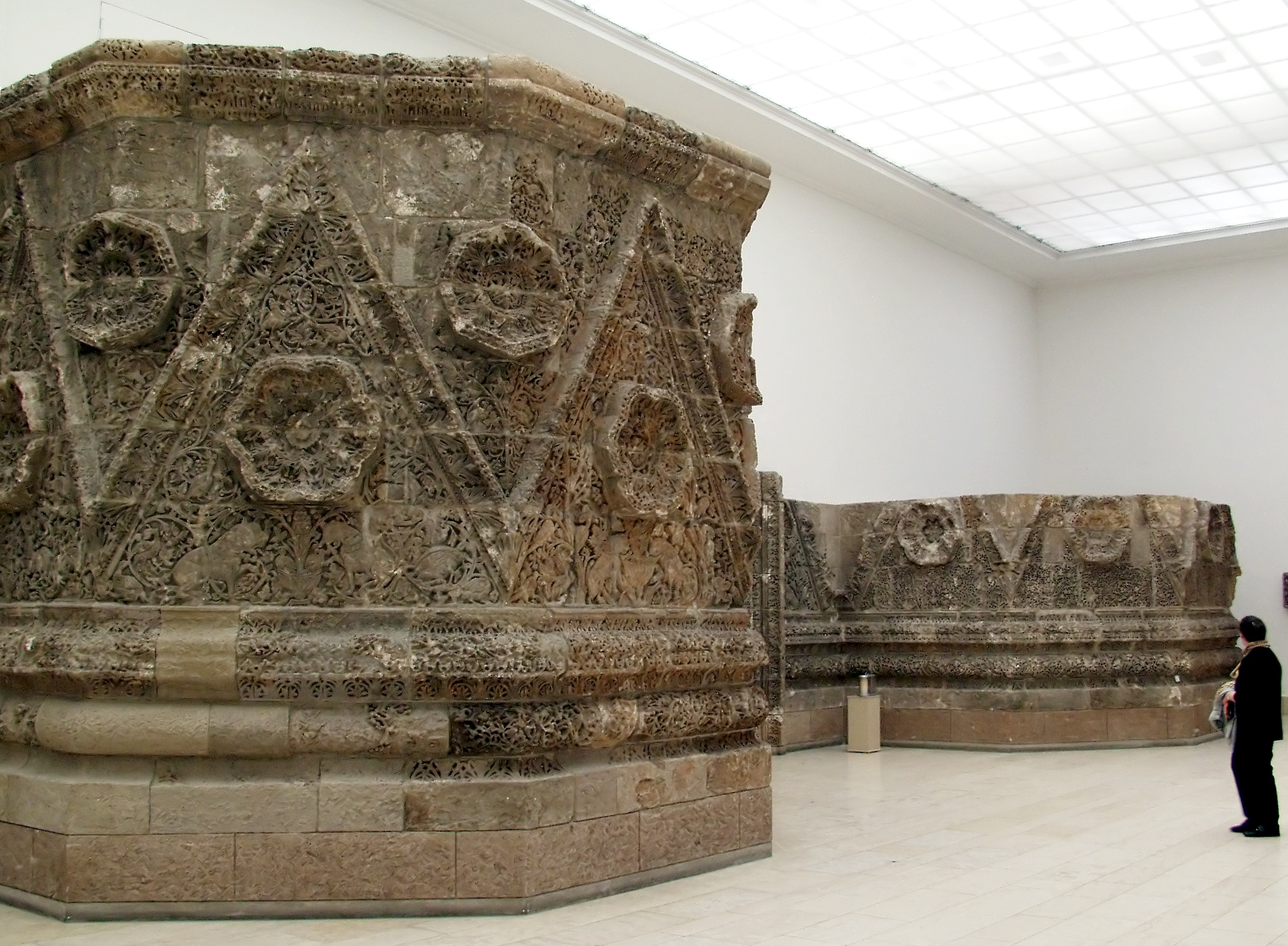
- Mshatta Facade in the Museum of Islamic Art
- Established: 18 October 1904
- Location: Berlin (Pergamonmuseum)
- Coordinates: 52°31′15″N 13°23′47″E
- Type: Archaeology and Islamic art
- Accreditation: Staatliche Museen zu Berlin (Stiftung Preußischer Kulturbesitz)
- Director: Stefan Weber
- Website: www.smb.museum/museen-und-einrichtungen/museum-fuer-islamische-kunst/home.html

The Museum of Islamic Art (German: Museum für Islamische Kunst) is located in the Pergamon Museum and is part of the Staatliche Museen zu Berlin.

== Collection ==
The museum exhibits diverse works of Islamic art from the 7th century to the 19th century from the area between Spain and India. Excavation activity in Ctesiphon, Samarra and Tabgha, as well as acquisition opportunities, led to Egypt, the Foreign Orient and Iran in particular being important focal points. Other regions are represented by important collection objects or groups, such as the calligraphy and miniature painting from the Mughal Empire or the sicilian ivory works of art.

=== Important objects of the collection ===
The most notable pieces of the collection, which are kept variously because of their size, historical significance, or popularity with museum visitors, are:

- Mshatta Facade from the Umayyad palace of Mshatta in Jordan
- The Aleppo Room is the wall paneling from a broker's home in Aleppo, Syria, that was commissioned during the Ottoman Period.
- Alhambra cupola
- Mihrab from Kashan
- Mihrab from Konya
- Dragon-Phoenix carpet, Asia Minor, early 15th century.
- Quran-folding desk, Asia Minor (Konya), 13th century
- Book art (changing exhibition in the book art cabinets).

In addition to the permanent exhibition, the museum also shows exhibitions of modern art from the Islamic world, in 2008, for example, "Turkish Delight" (contemporary Turkish design) and "Naqsh" (gender and role models in Iran).

In 2009, the museum received on permanent loan a collection of Islamic art from the London collector Edmund de Unger (1918–2011), the so-called "Keir Collection", formerly housed in his home in Ham, Surrey. The collection, assembled over more than 50 years, comprises some 1,500 works of art spanning 2,000 years and is one of the largest private collections of Islamic art. More than one hundred exhibits from the Keir Collection were first shown in 2007/2008 in the special exhibition Sammlerglück. Islamic Art from the Edmund de Unger Collection presented to the public at the Pergamon Museum. Another special exhibition with parts of this loan took place from March 2010 as part of the permanent exhibition of the Museum of Islamic Art entitled Sammlerglück. Masterpieces of Islamic Art from the Keir Collection. In July 2012, the cooperation between the National Museums in Berlin-Prussian Cultural Heritage and the owners of the Edmund de Unger Collection was terminated and the collection, originally intended as a long-term loan, was withdrawn. The reasons given were differing ideas on how to continue working with the collection.

== History ==
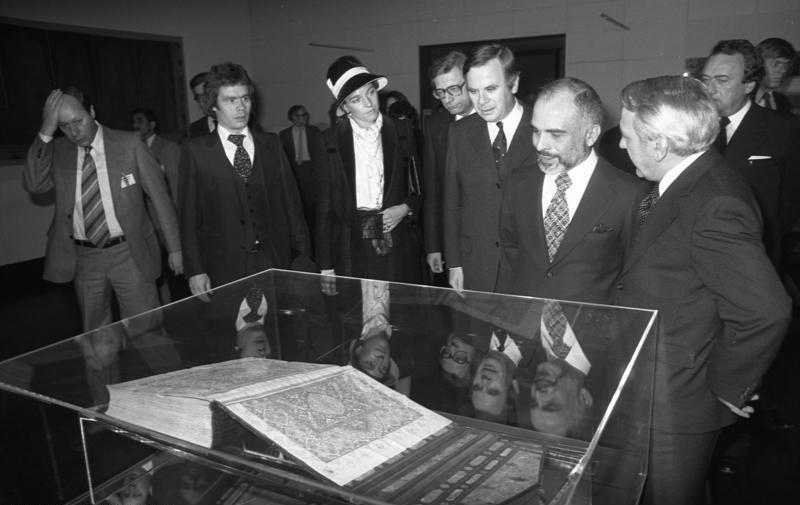
King Hussein and Queen Nūr were shown around the Museum of Islamic Art in Dahlem by Director Klaus Brisch (foreground right) led (6 November 1978)

The museum was founded in 1904 by Wilhelm von Bode as the Islamic Department in the Kaiser-Friedrich-Museum (today's Bode-Museum) and initially established by Friedrich Sarre as honorary director. The occasion was the donation of the Mshatta facade, which originates from an unfinished umayyad desert palace located south of Amman by the Ottoman Sultan Abdülhamid II to Emperor Wilhelm II. Parts of the eastern portion of the facade and the ruins of the structure of which it formed a part remain in Jordan. Together with 21 carpets donated by Bode, the facade formed the basis of the collection. In the newly built Pergamon Museum, the museum moved into the upper floor of the south wing and was opened there in 1932. Because of II. World War, the exhibition was closed in 1939.

Despite the removal of artworks and the securing of objects remaining in the Pergamon Museum, the collection suffered damage and losses. A bomb hit destroyed one of the gate towers of the Mshatta façade, and an incendiary bomb burned all or part of valuable carpets housed in a vault at the Mint. In 1954 the collection was reopened as the Islamic Museum in the Pergamon Museum. The holdings that had been removed to the western occupation zones were returned to the museum in Dahlem, where they were also reexhibited in 1954 for the first time after the war. From 1968 to 1970, there was an exhibition in Charlottenburg Palace. In 1971, the permanent exhibition of the Museum of Islamic Art was opened in a new building in the Dahlem museum complex.

In 1958, the Islamic Museum in the Pergamon Museum on the Museumsinsel received back most of the artworks transferred to the Soviet Union from 1945 to 1946 as looted art. With the restoration of other important collection objects, it became possible to open all exhibition rooms to the public by 1967. Based on the Unification Treaty, the two museums were organizationally merged in 1992 under the name Museum of Islamic Art. At the Dahlem site, the exhibition closed in 1998. A newly designed permanent exhibition was opened on the upper floor of the south wing in the Pergamon Museum in 2000.

=== Directors ===
The history of the collection was significantly shaped by the respective heads and directors, who thus simultaneously influenced the development of Islamic art history in Germany.

Wilhelm von Bode		1904–1921	
Friedrich Sarre		1921–1931	
Ernst Kühnel		1931–1951	
Dahlem		Museum Island	
Kurt Erdmann	1958–1964	Wolfgang Dudzus	1959–1965 Director of the Islamic Museum
Klaus Brisch	1966–1988	Volkmar Enderlein	1965–1971 acting director, 1971–1978 amt. Director
Michael Meinecke	1988–1991	Volkmar Enderlein	1978–1991
Michael Meinecke		1992–1995	
Volkmar Enderlein		1995–2001	
Claus-Peter Haase		1 December 2001 – 31 January 2009	
Stefan Weber		since 1 February 2009	

== Multaka: Museum as Meeting Point ==
In 2015, the museum started a new project for Arabic- and Persian-speaking refugees and other Muslim visitors titled "Multaka - Museum as Meeting Point". This intercultural museum project organizes guided tours for refugees and migrants designed and offered for free by specially trained Arabic-speaking Multaka guides. The visitor-centered discussions with migrants in their language are focused on the historical origin and history of acquisition of cultural objects, including the visitors' own understanding of their country's cultural heritage. In 2019 the four founding museums in Berlin joined six similar museums in the United Kingdom, Italy, Greece and Switzerland, creating the international Multaka network.

== Exhibitions ==
=== Permanent exhibitions ===
- since 2000: Islamic Cultures
- since 2016: transcultural relations, global biographies – Islamic art?

=== Special exhibitions ===
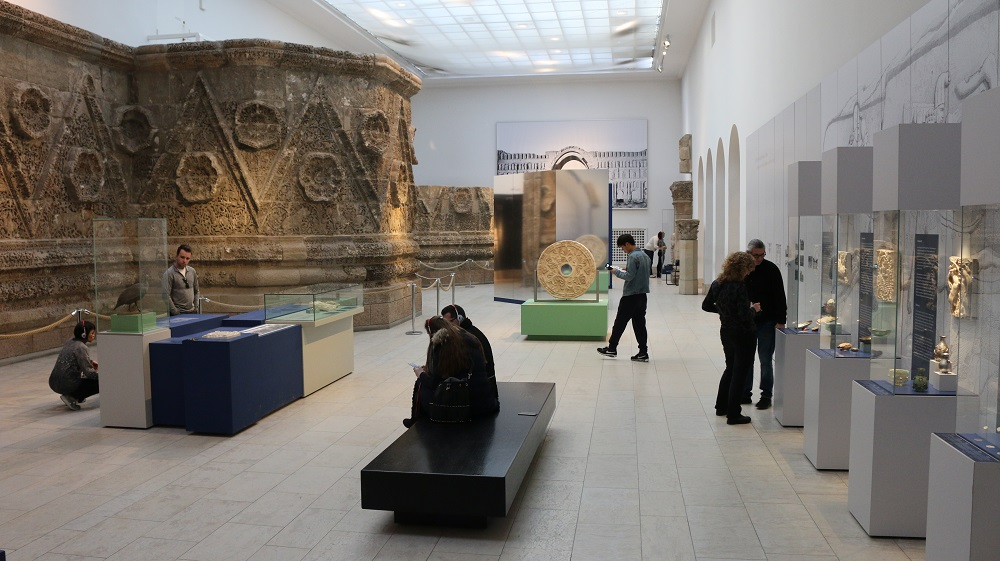
Special exhibition The Legacy of the Ancient Kings. Ctesiphon and the Persian sources of Islamic art (2016–2017)

2013

- Samarra – Center of the World.
- Masterpieces from the Seraglio paintings from the adhesive albums of Heinrich Friedrich von Diez
- Affordable to many. Printed fabrics from Egyptian tombs.
- Ornament and tongue: book bindings from the Islamic world.

2014

- Indulgence and Intoxication. Wine, tobacco and drugs in Indian paintings.
- Pride and Passion. Representations of men in the Mughal period.
- Mshatta in Focus. The Jordanian desert castle in historical photographs.

2015

- Picnic in the Park. Gardens in Islamic Miniature Painting
- Aatifi – News from Afghanistan.
- How Islamic Art Came to Berlin. The collector and museum director Friedrich Sarre

2016

- Mystical Travelers: Sufis, ascetics, and holy men.
- Reading words – feeling words An introduction to the Koran in Berlin collections.
- Contrast Syria. Photographs by Mohamad Al Roumi
- The Legacy of the Ancient Kings. Ctesiphon and the Persian sources of Islamic art.

2017

- Iran. Dawn of Modernity.
- Faithful wonder – Biblical traditions in the Islamic world.
- Cozy: rugs in Indian miniature paintings.

2018

- Perched | Stopover. An Installation by Felekşan Onar.
- Copy and Mastery.
- The Gallery in the Book. Islamic scrapbooks
- Tape Art
- With a sense of proportion. Masterpieces of architecture in Yemen

== Research and outreach projects ==
=== Exhibition placement ===
- Fellowship International Museum of the Federal Cultural Foundation.
- Objects of Transfer
- Cultural Stories from the Museum of Islamic Arts
- Multaka: Treffpunkt Museum – Refugees as Guides in Berlin Museums

=== Research abroad ===
- Areia Antiqua. Ancient Herat / 3 projects
- Creation of digital cultural property registers for Syria
- Iran: The Provincial Museum Yazd / National Museum Tehran
- Qasr al-Mschatta: The Early Islamic Desert Castle of Mschatta, Jordan
- Reconstruction of an ancient cultural landscape in Baluchistan, Pakistan
- The Citadel of Aleppo, Syria

=== Cultural and political education ===
- Multaka project for museum educational access for Muslim visitors
- Common past – common future
- TAMAM – The educational project of mosque communities with the Museum of Islamic Art

=== Collection-related research ===
- Khurasan – Land of the Sunrise
- Ctesiphon
- Samarra and the art of the Abbasids
- The Yousef Jameel Digitization Project
Collection Highlights

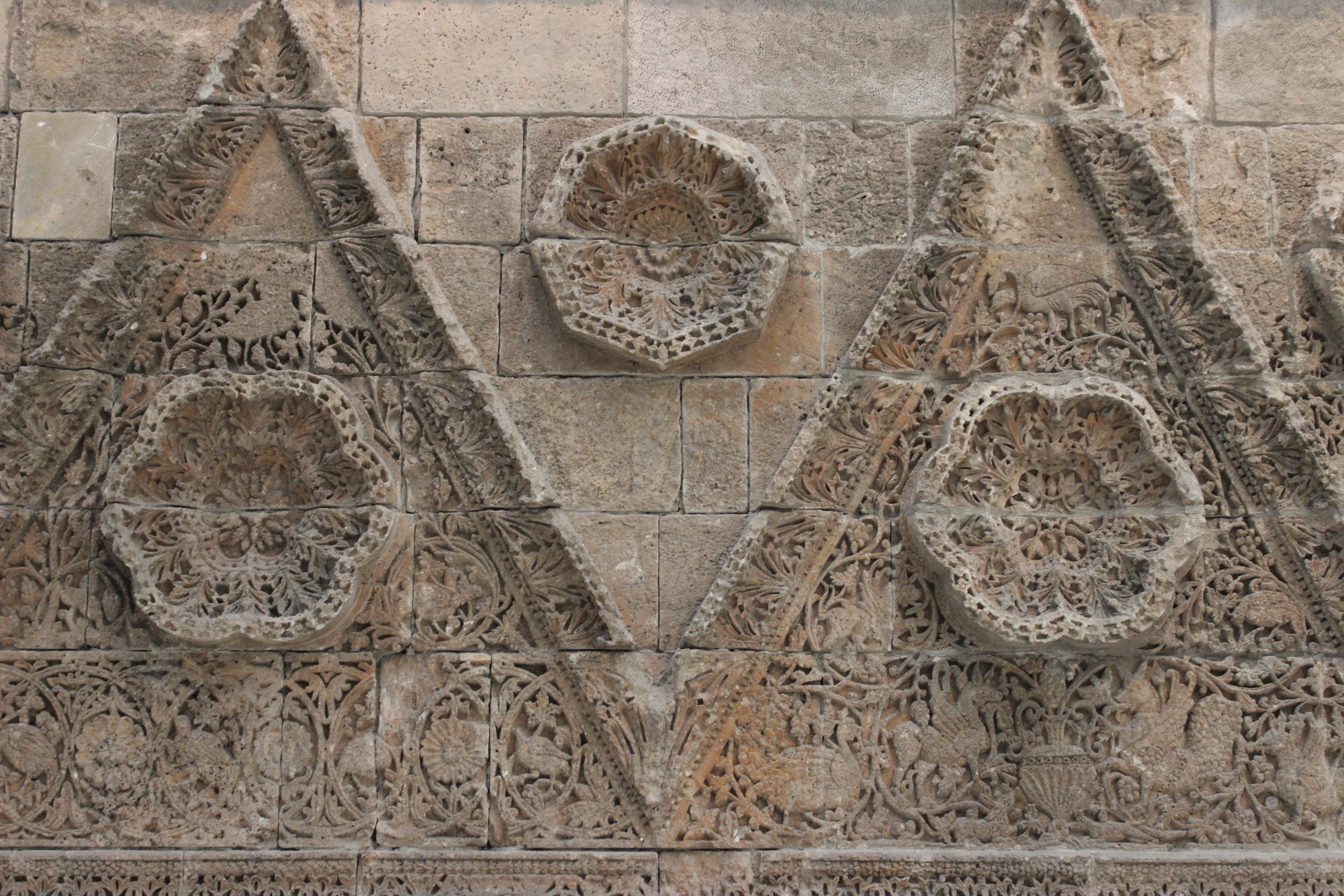
Mshatta Facade (detail), Mid-8th century

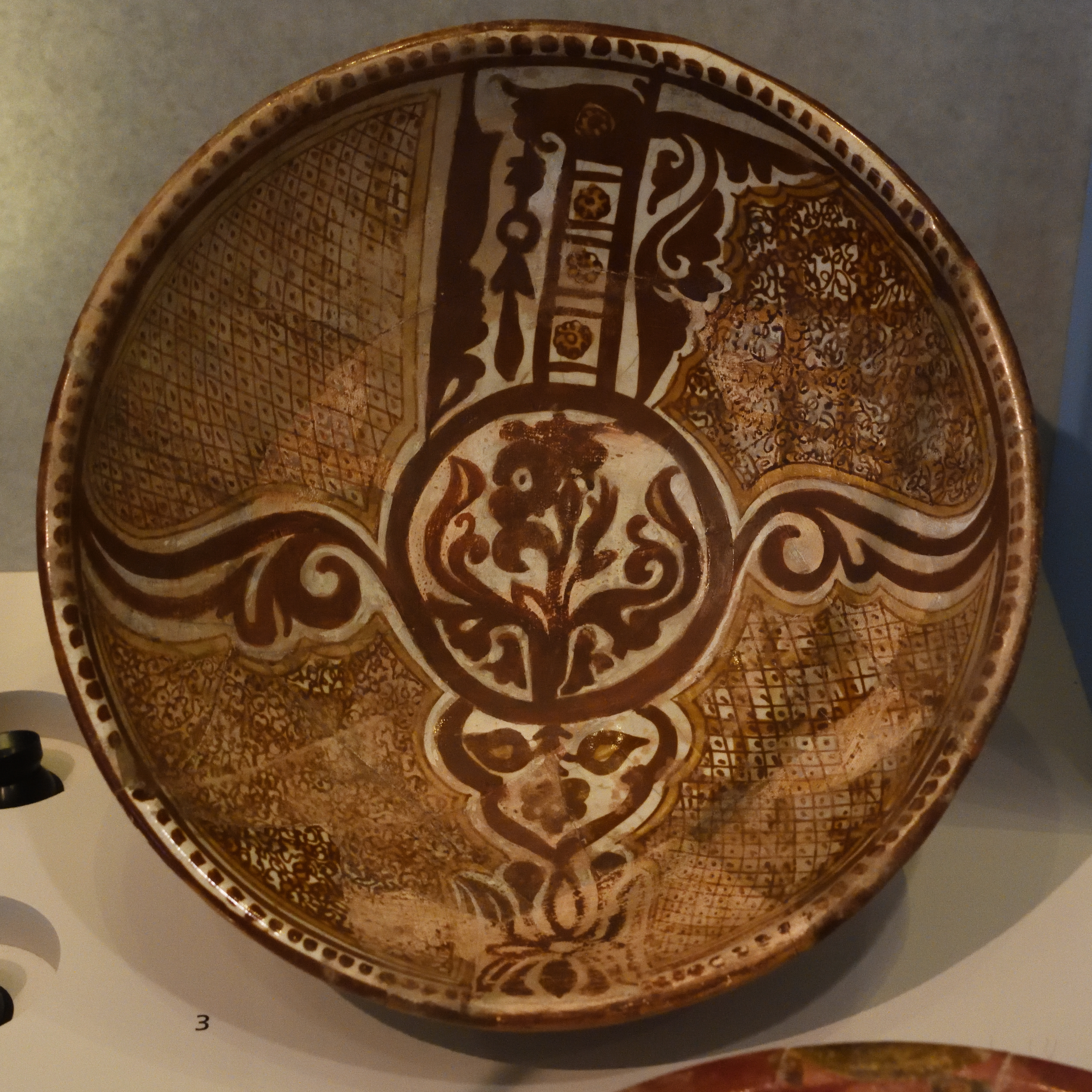
Bowl from Abbasid Samarra, 9th century

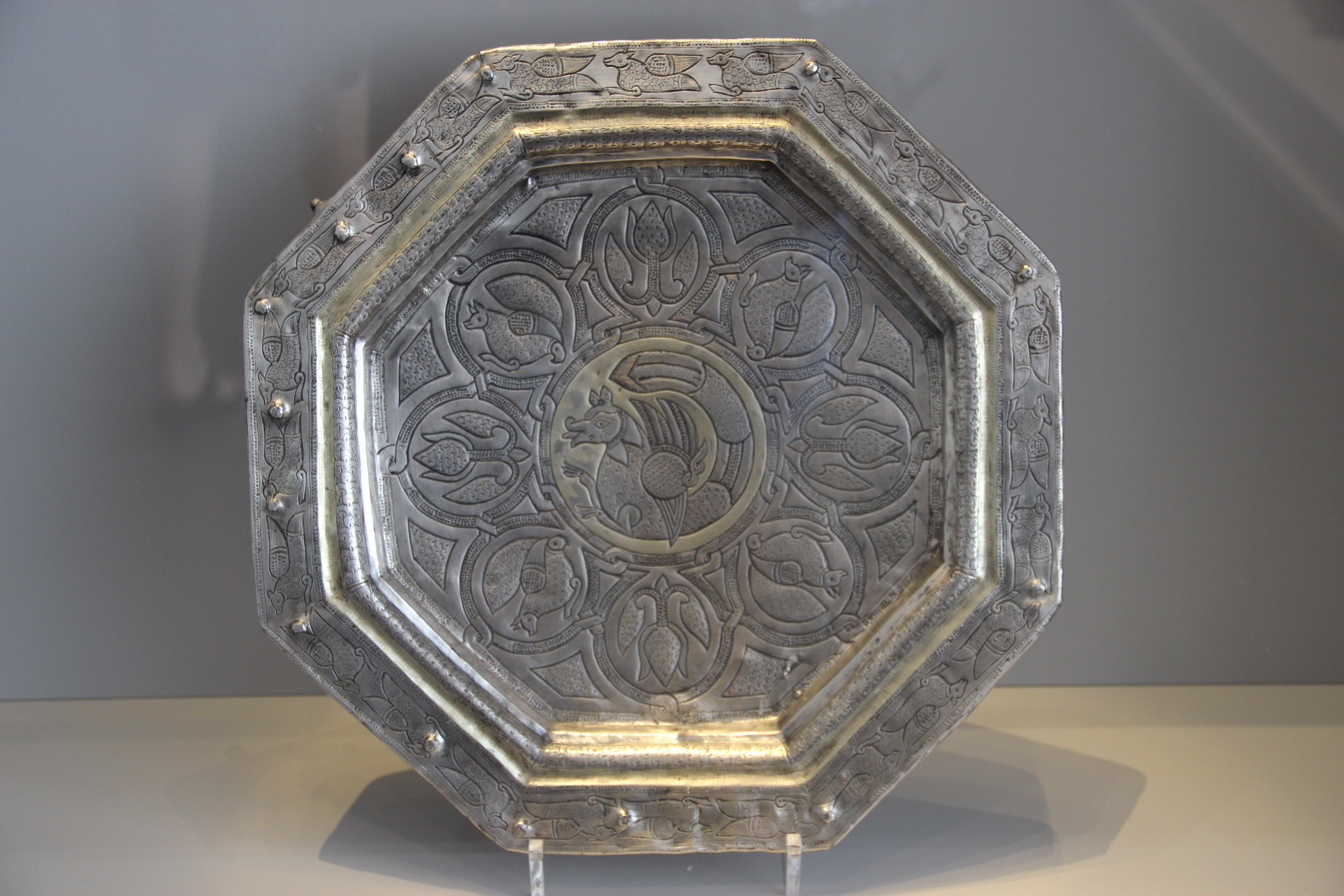
Samanid Simurgh Platter, 10th century

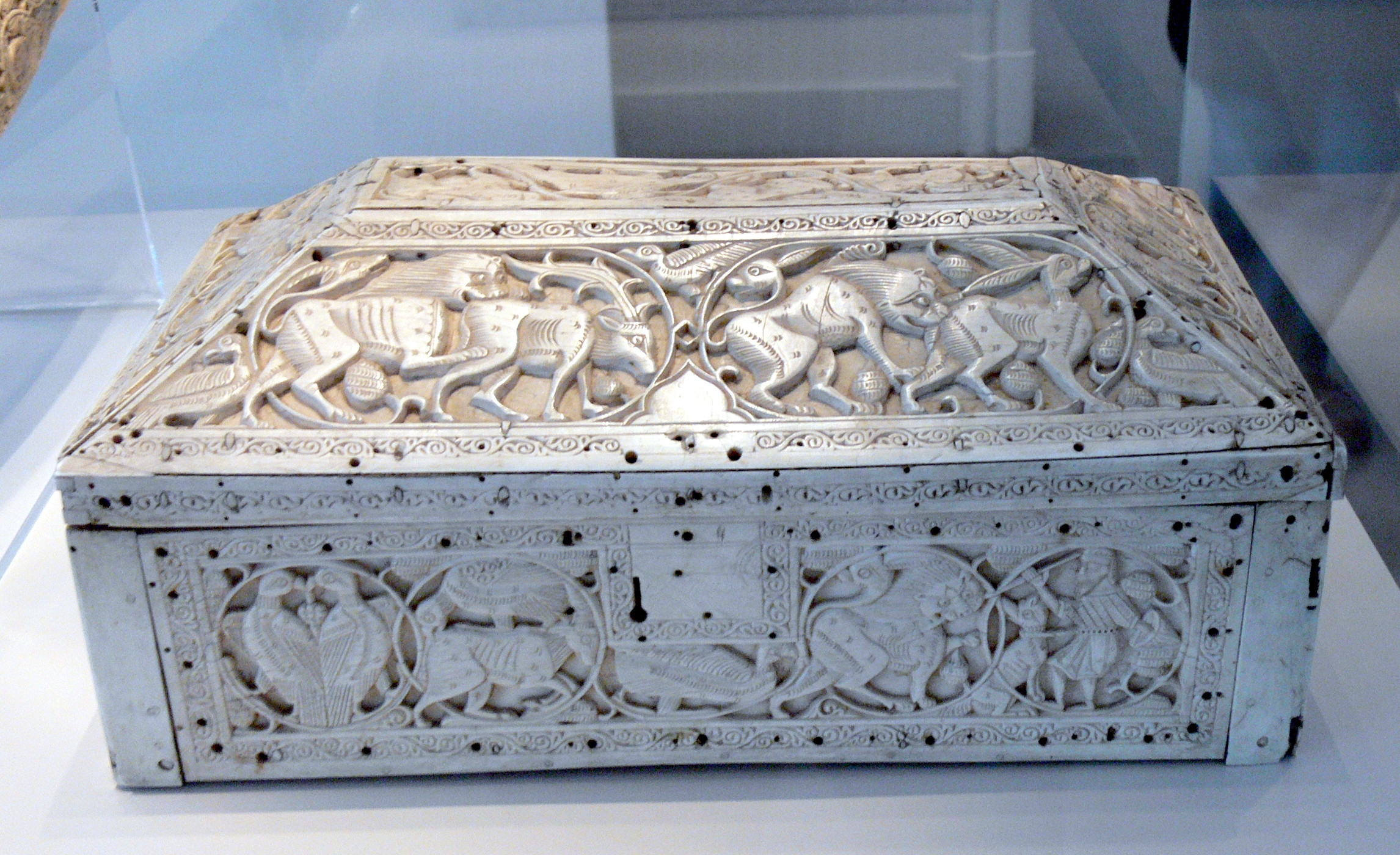
Siculo-Arabic Ivory Casket, 11th century

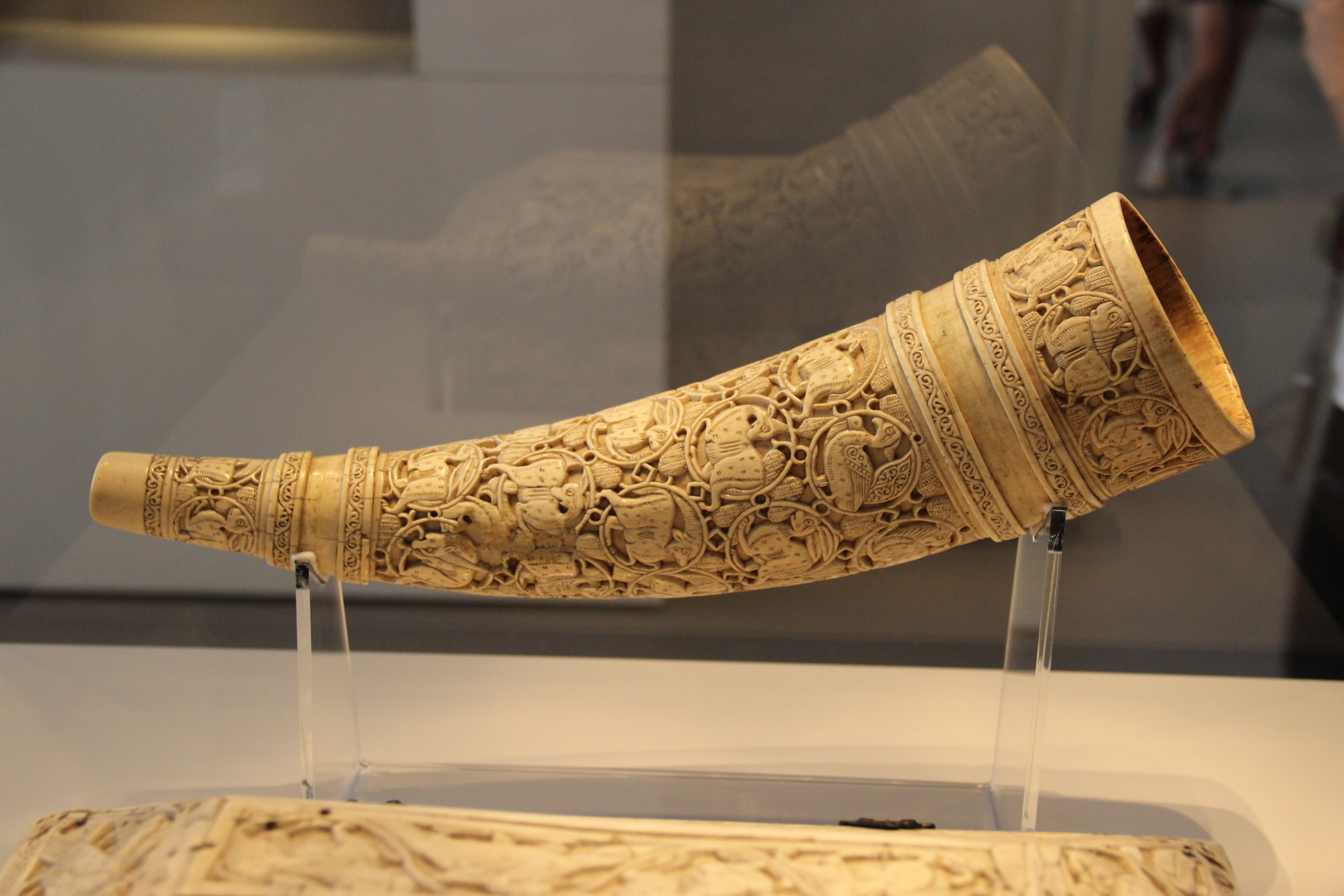
Signal horn (olifant) of ivory with figural decoration, Lower Italy or Sicily, 11th-12th century

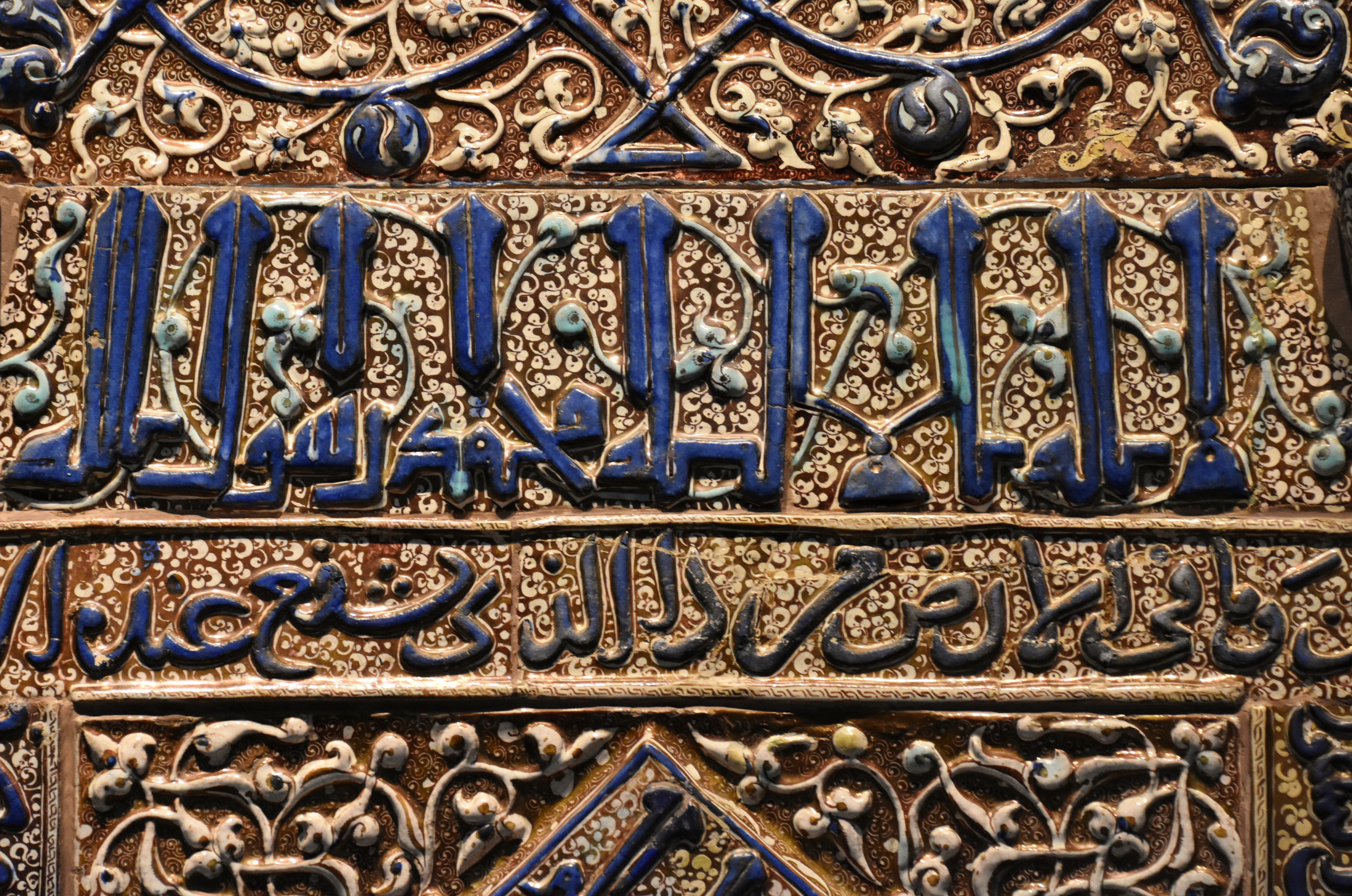
Mihrab from Kashan (detail), 1226

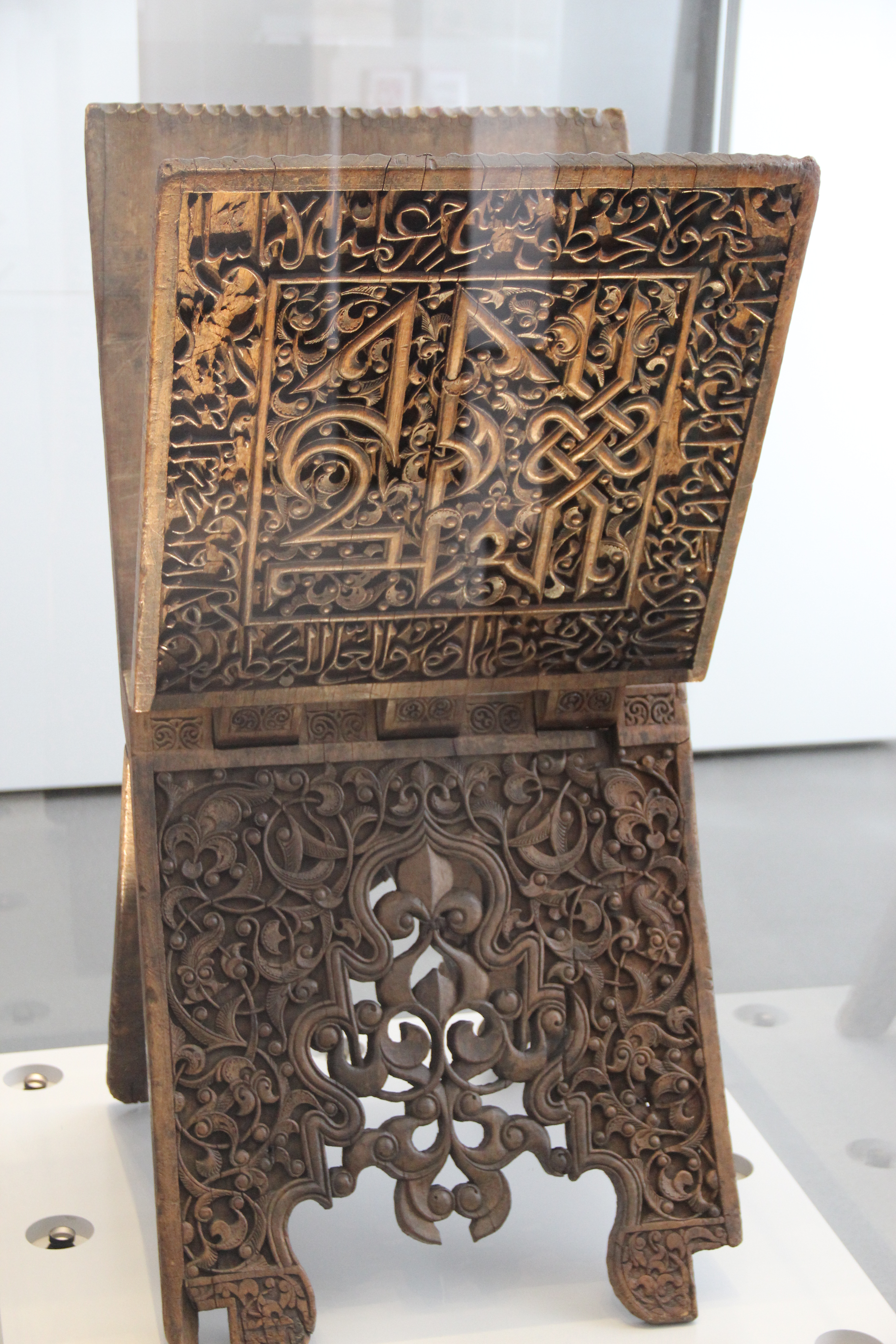
Seljuk Koran folding desk, Mid-13th century

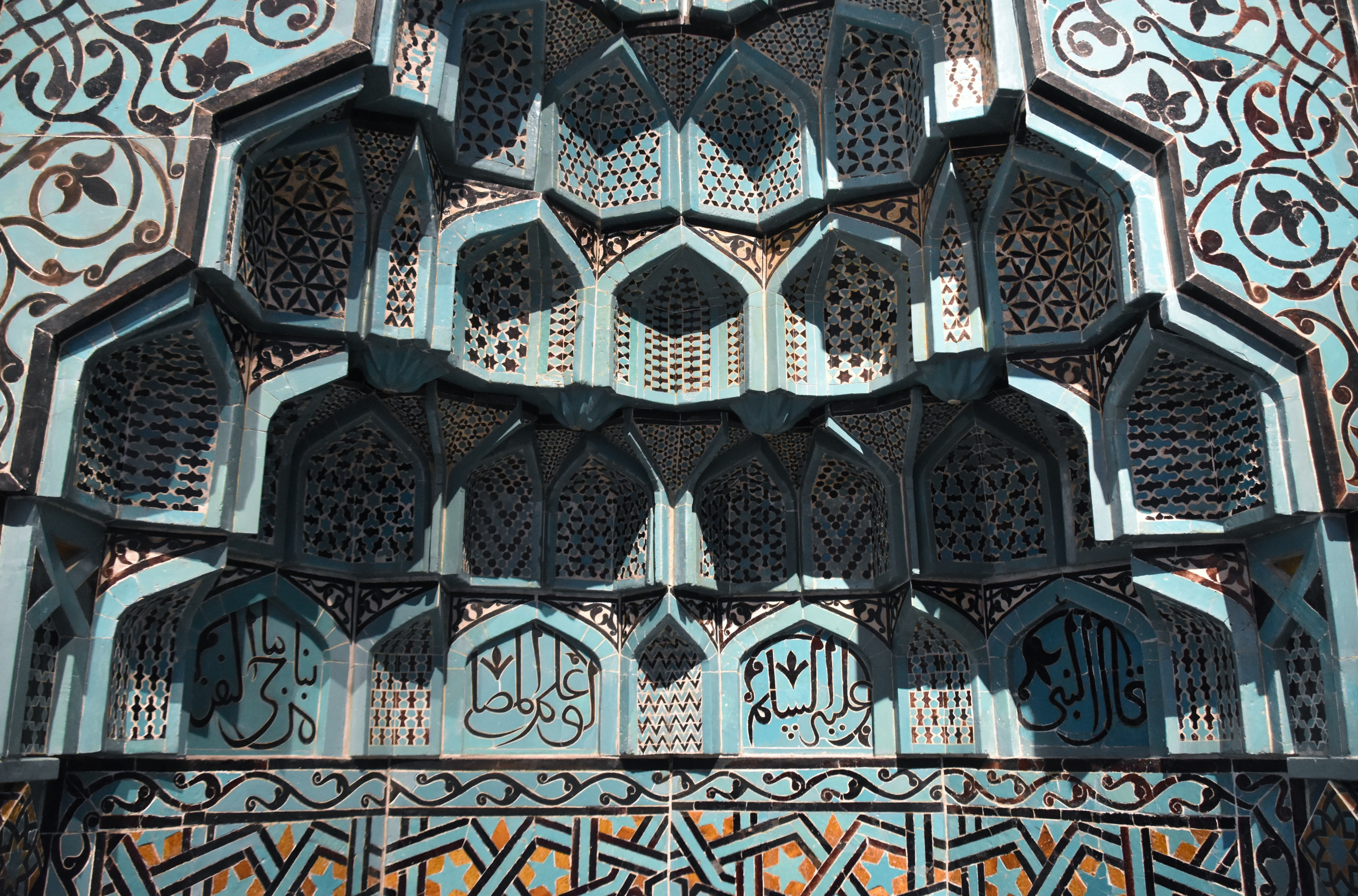
Mihrab from Konya (detail), 13th century

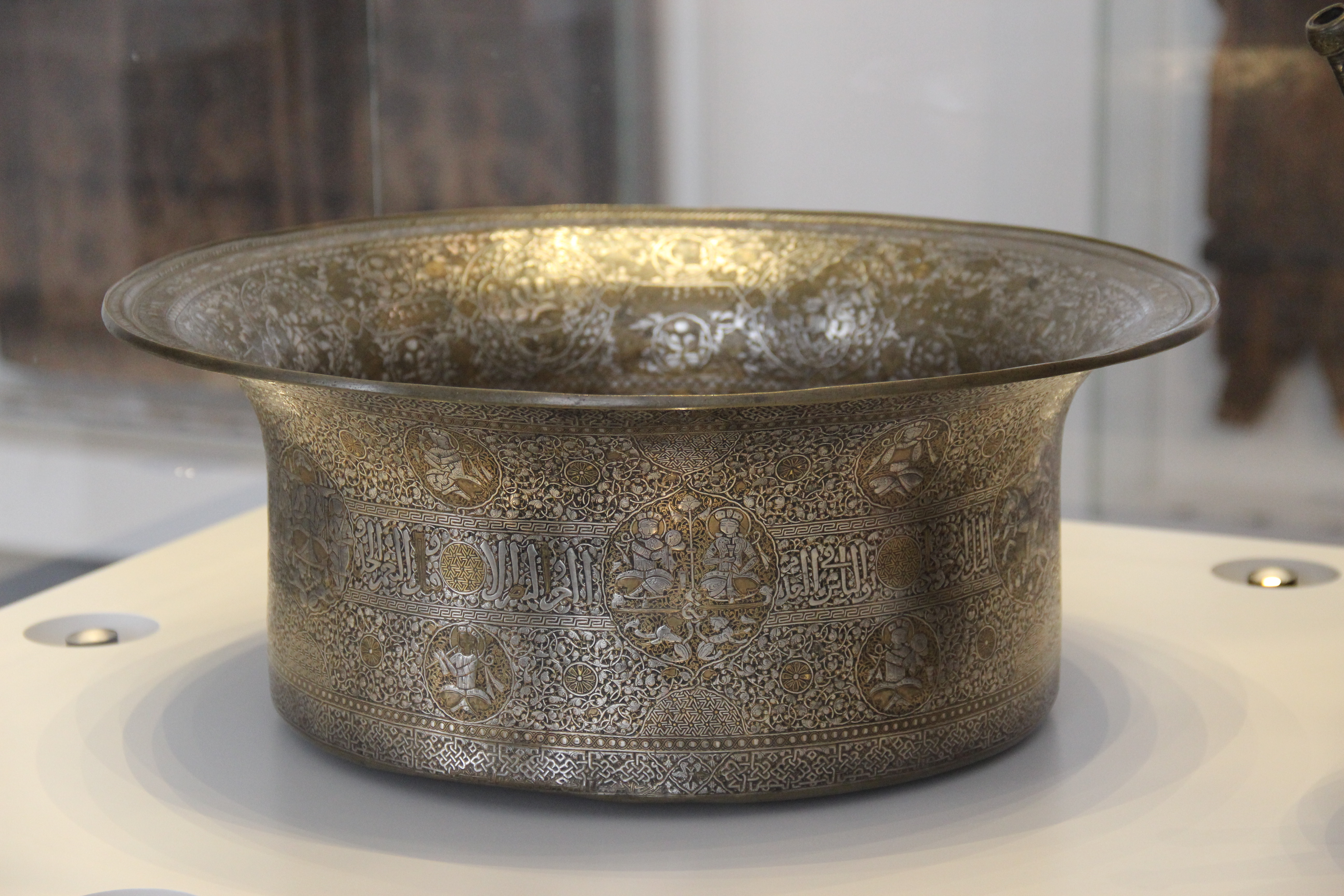
Wash Basin from Mosul, 1251 - 1275

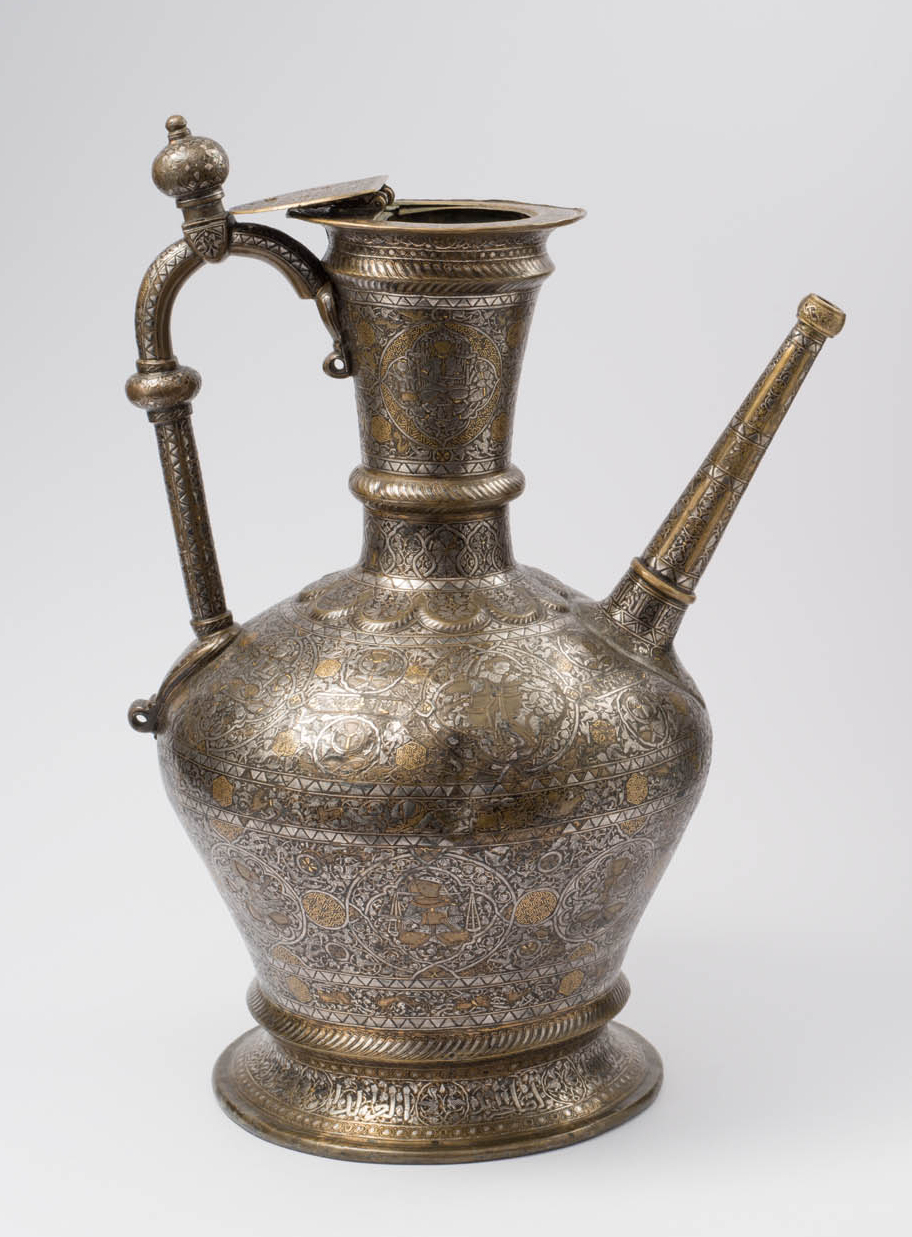
Pitcher from Mosul, 1251 - 1275

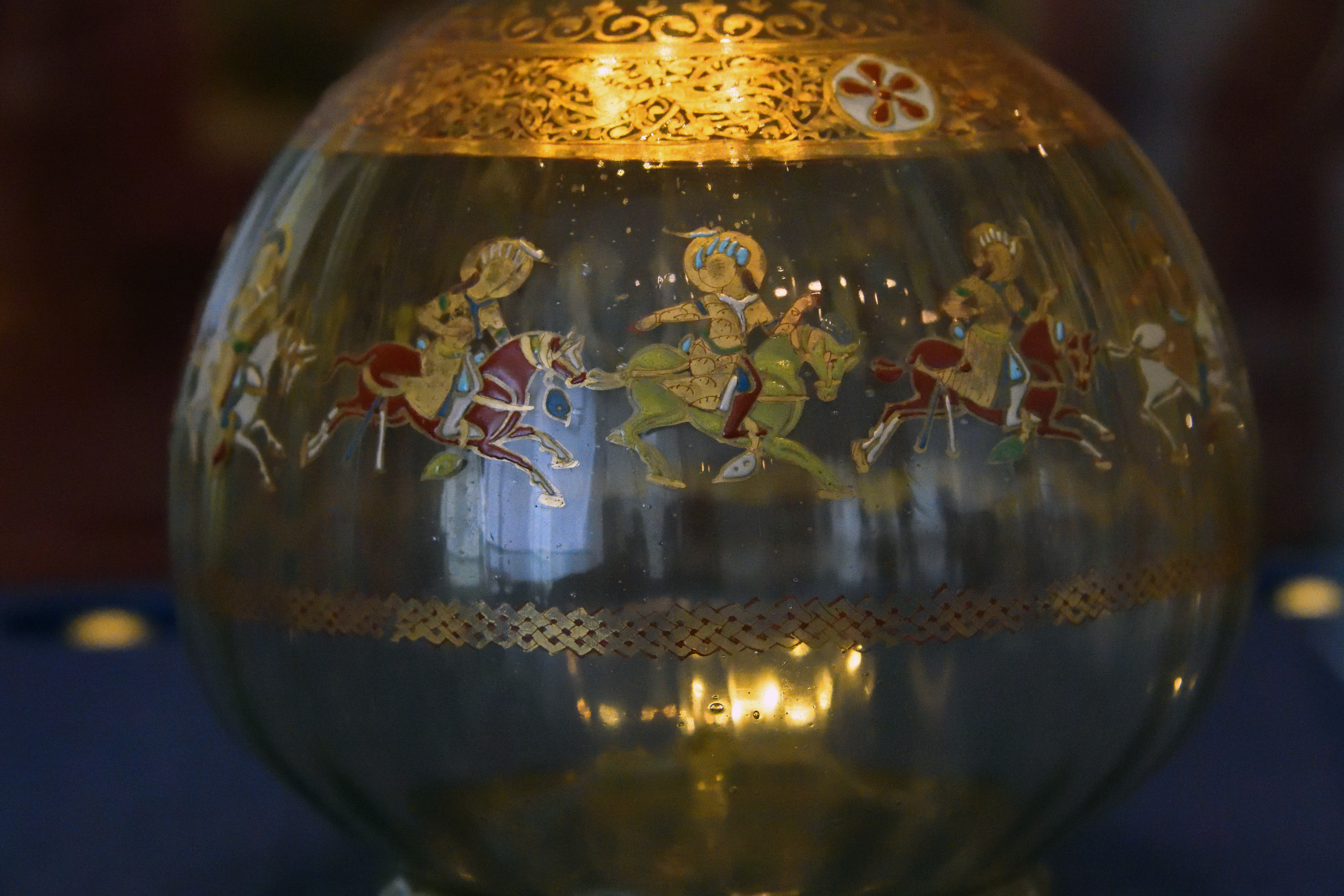
Mamluk bottle with polo-playing riders (detail), c. 1300

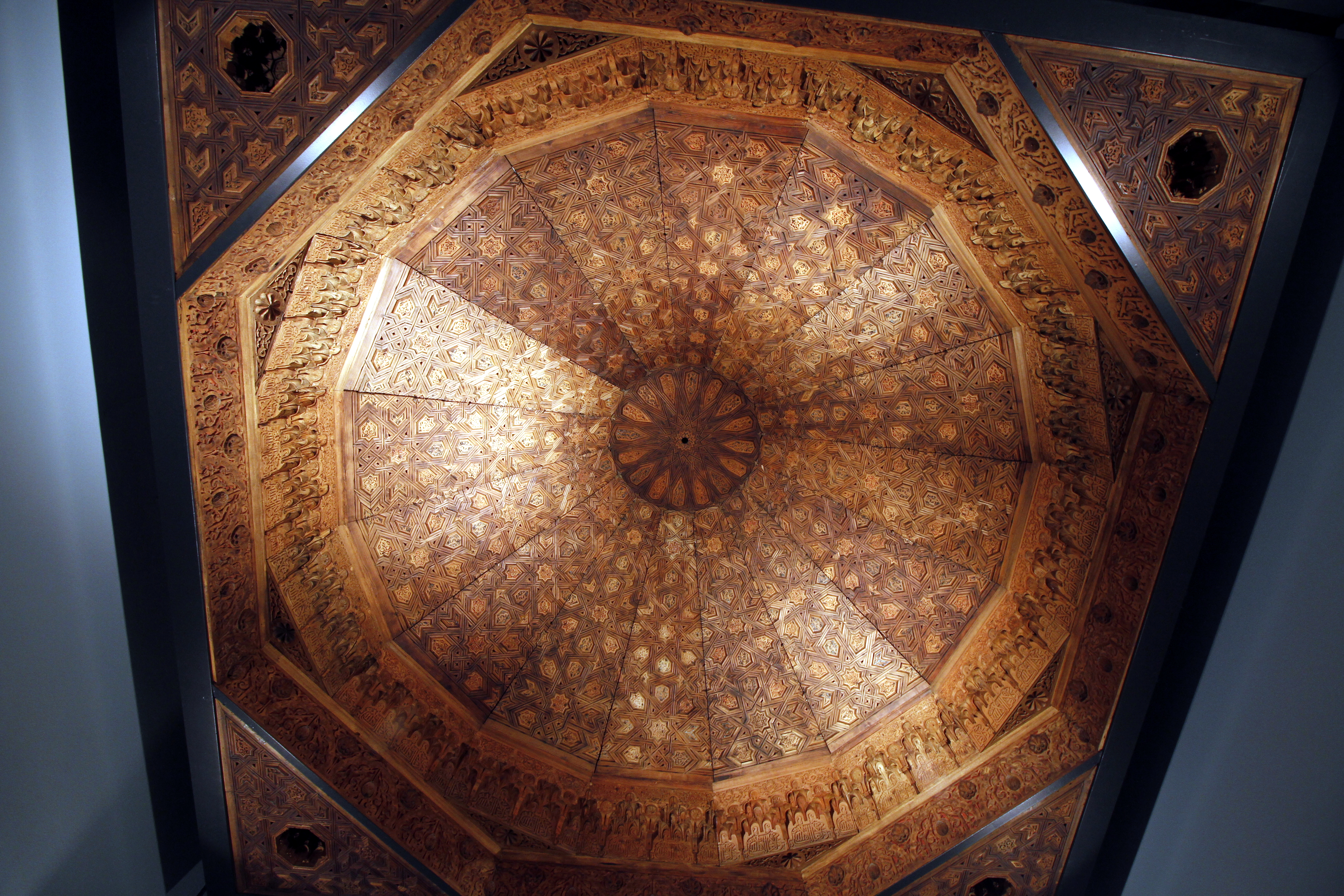
Alhambra cupola, c. 1320

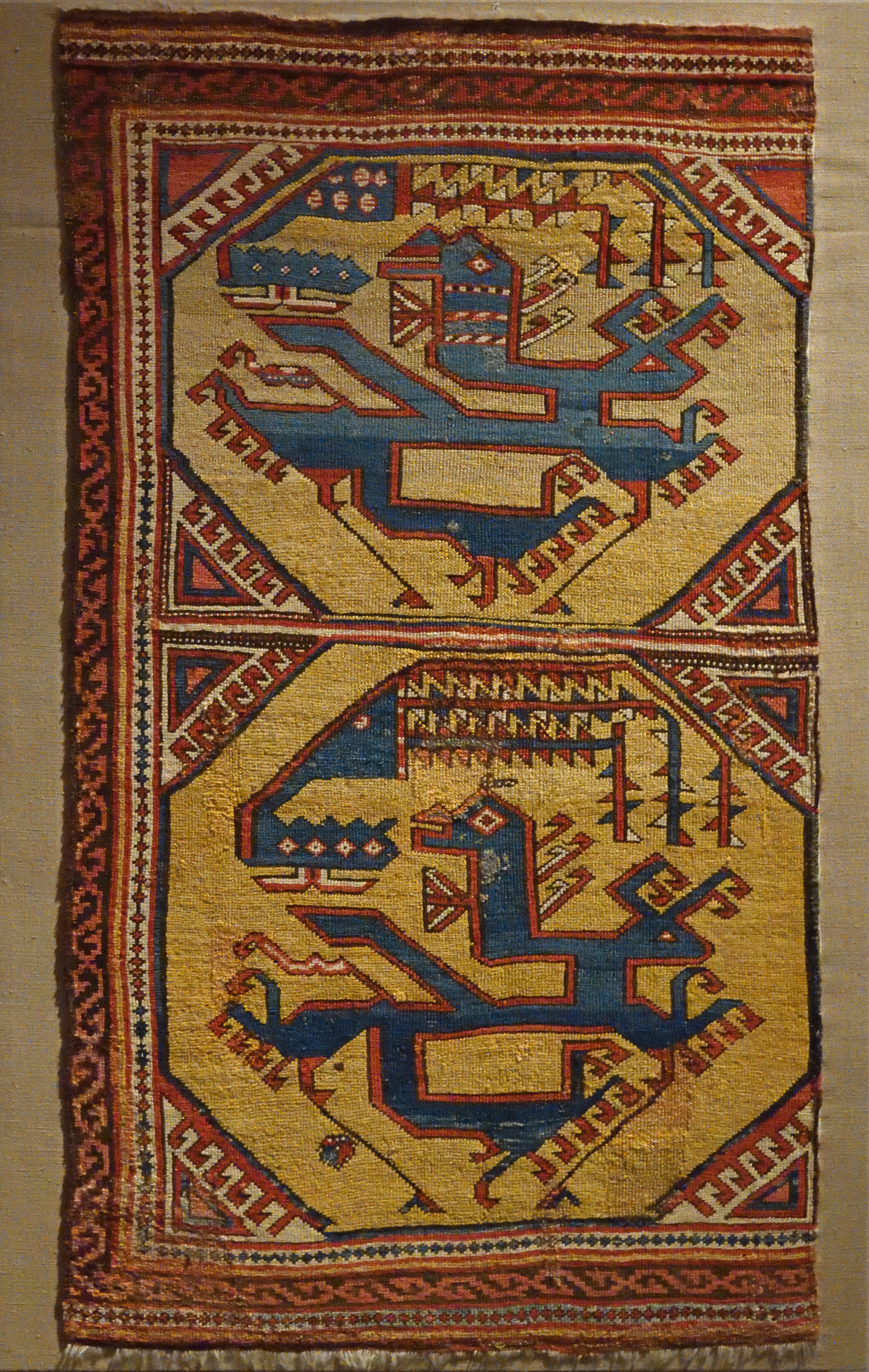
Dragon-Phoenix carpet, Mid-15th century - 16th century

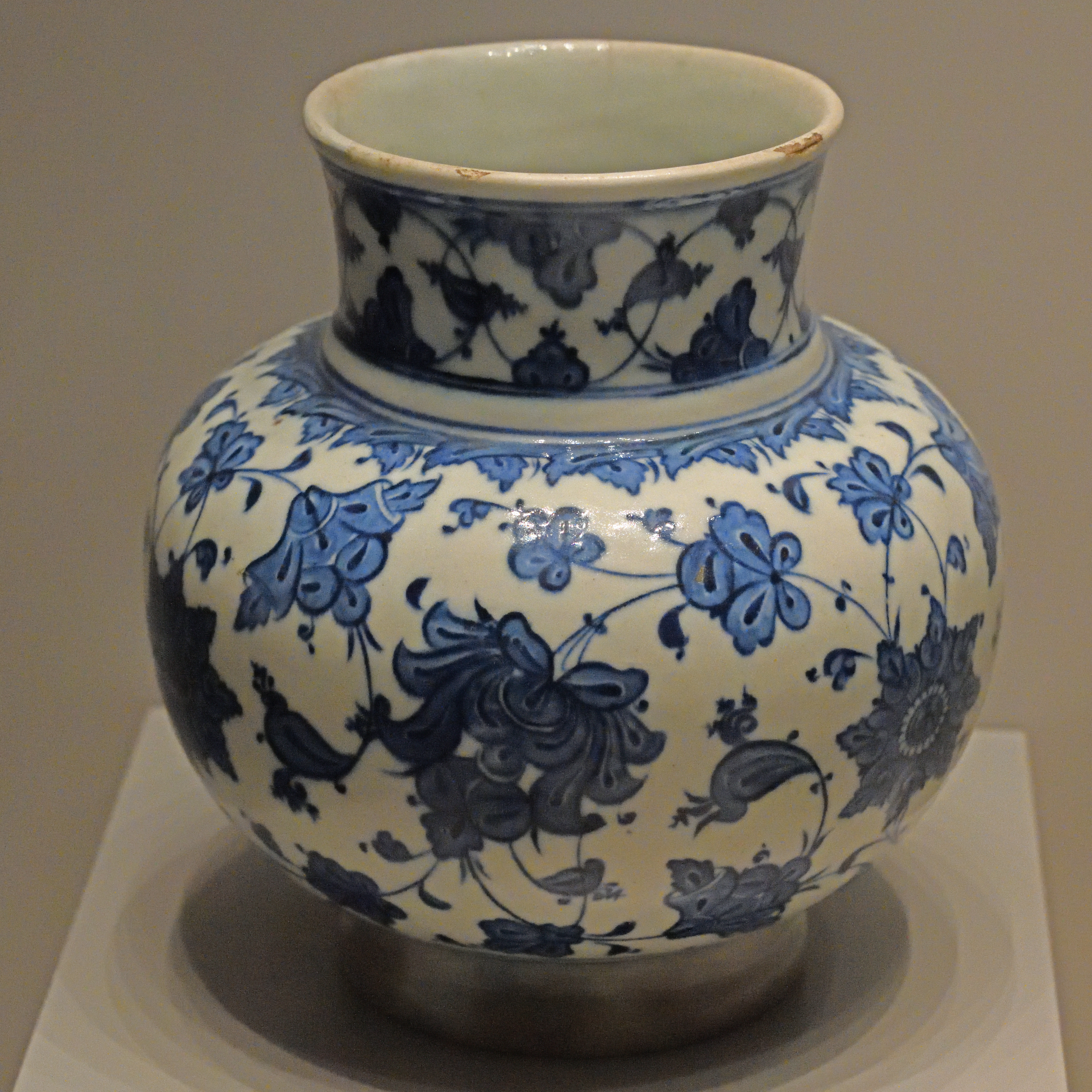
Vase (Iznik pottery), 1st quarter of the 16th century

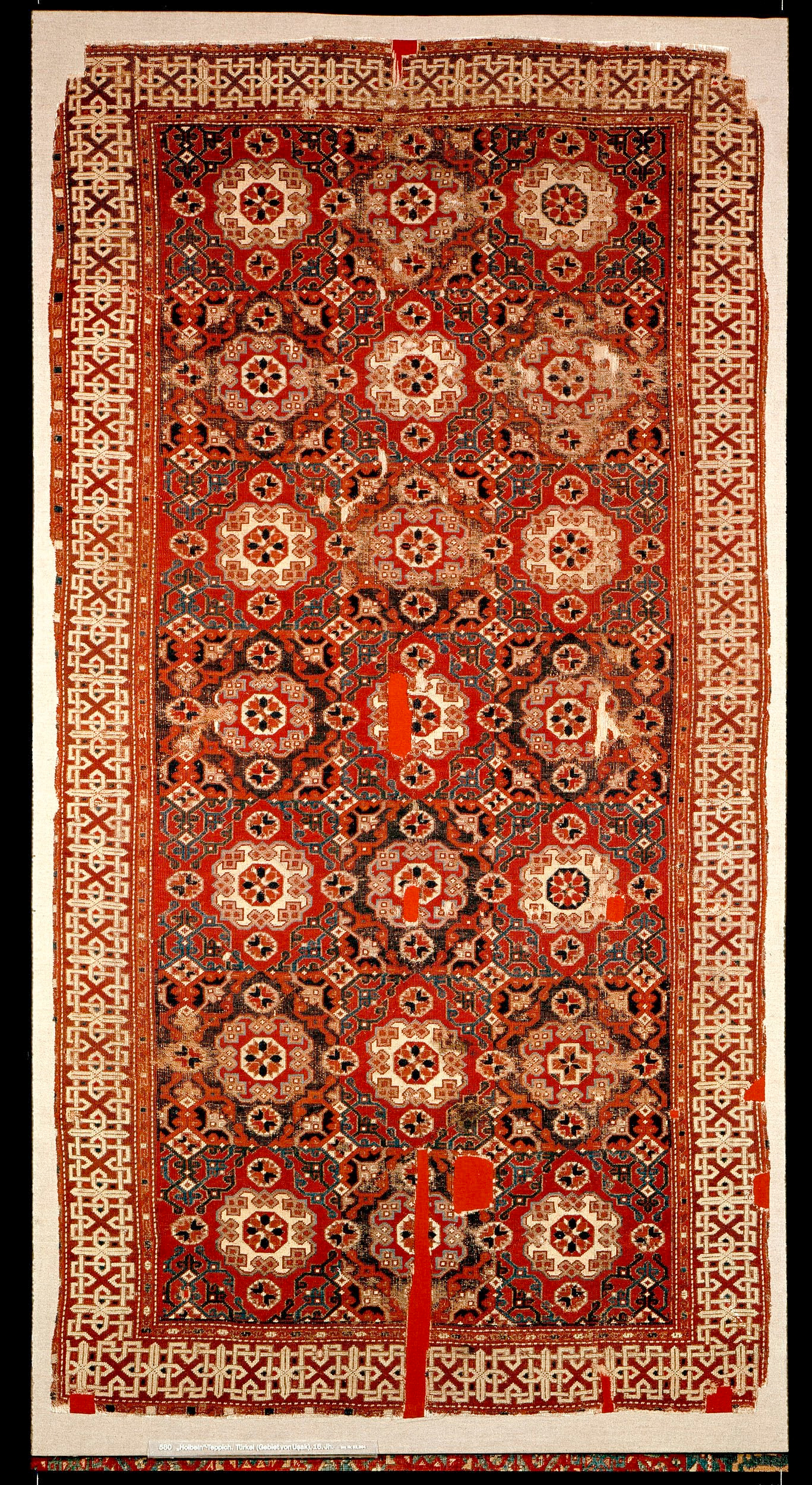
Small Pattern Holbein carpet, 16th century

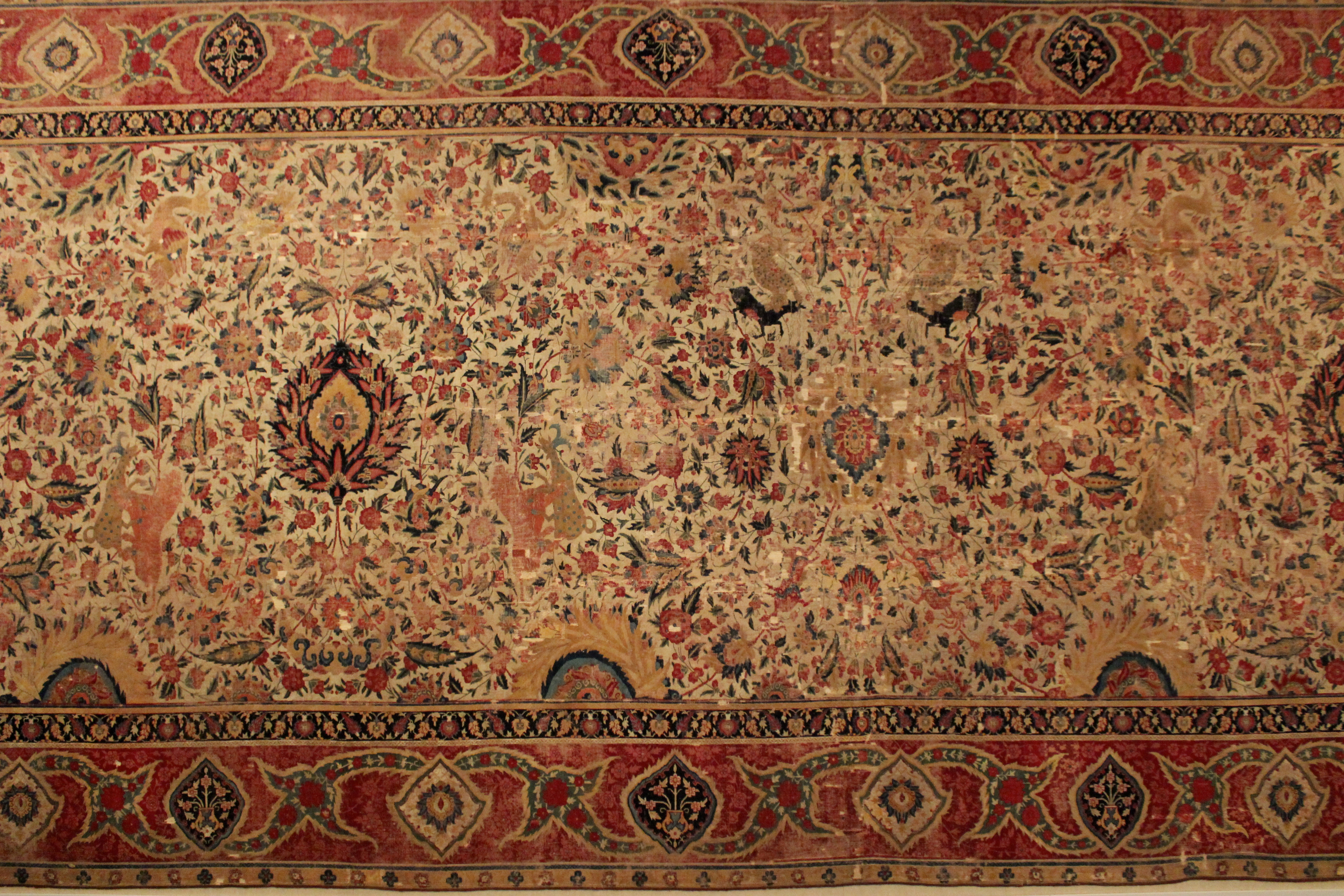
Spiral Tendril Mughal Carpet (detail), 16th - 17th century

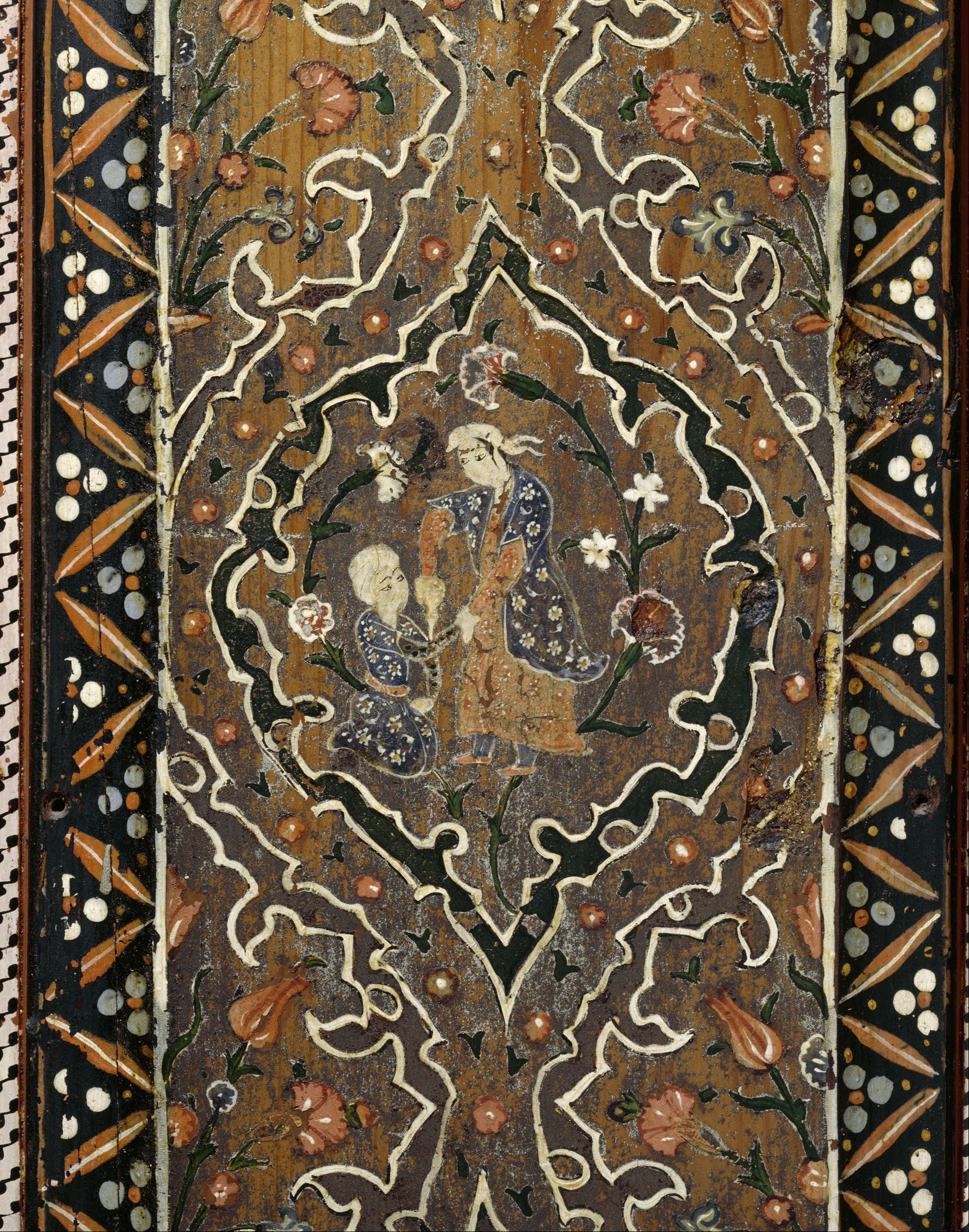
Aleppo Room, 1600 - 1603 (detail)

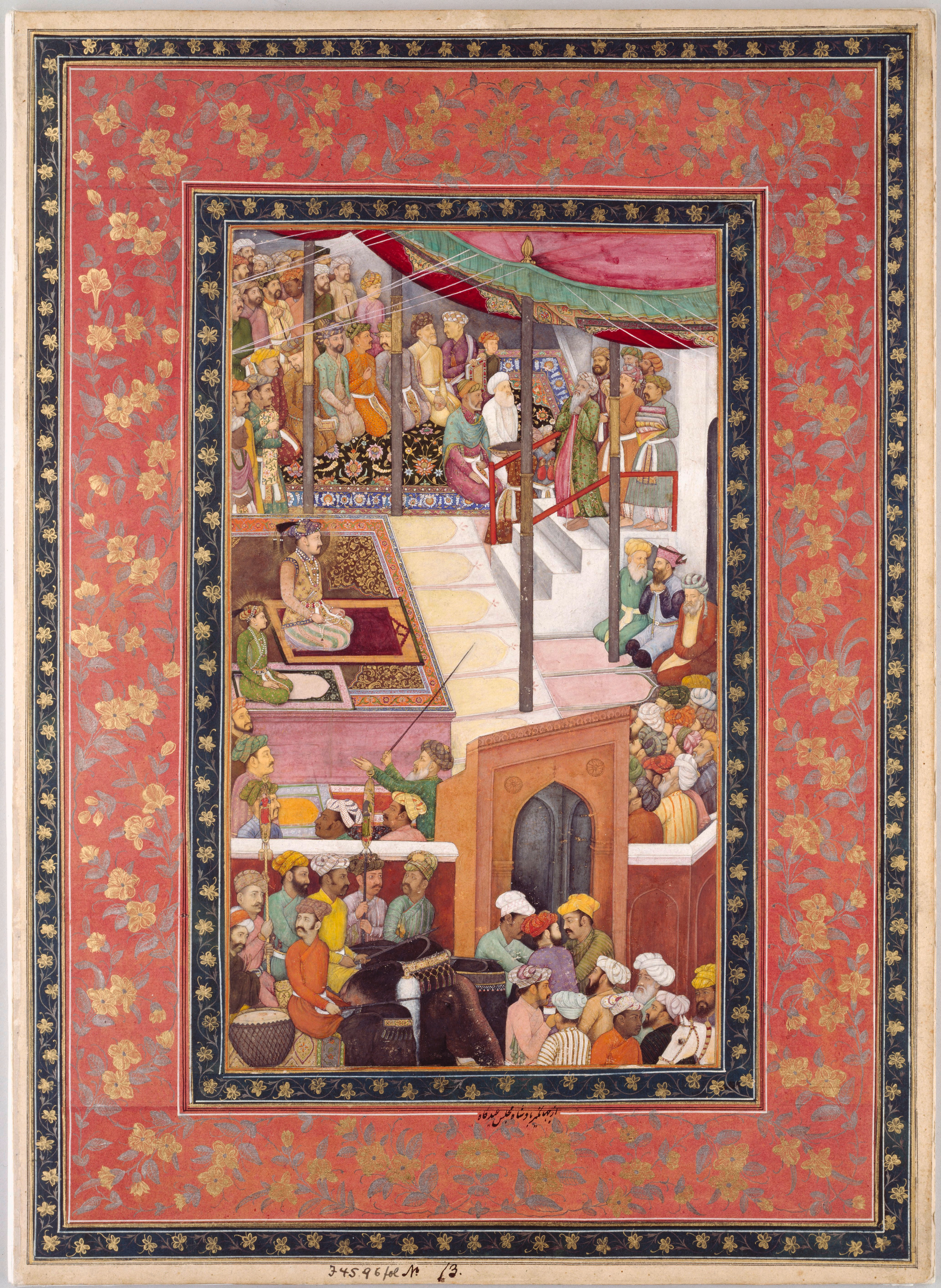
Emperor Jahangir at the gathering for the Eid al-Fitr, 1615–1625

== Bibliography ==
- Enderlein, Volkmar; Museum für Islamische Kunst; Stiftung Preußischer Kulturbesitz (2001). Museum für Islamische Kunst (in German). Mainz: Verlag Philipp von Zabern. ISBN 3-8053-2681-5. OCLC 47728676.
- Museum für Islamische Kunst; Enderlein, Volkmar; Staatliche Museen zu Berlin--Preußischer Kulturbesitz (2003). Museum of Islamic Art. Mainz: P. von Zabern. ISBN 3-8053-3261-0. OCLC 53938877.
- Kröger, Jens; Museum für Islamische Kunst (2004). Islamische Kunst in Berliner Sammlungen : [100 Jahre Museum für Islamische Kunst in Berlin; im Museum für Islamische Kunst, Berlin, vom 19. Oktober 2004 bis 16. Januar 2005] (in German). Berlin: Parthas. ISBN 3-86601-435-X. OCLC 58421771.
- Jens Kröger: Das Berliner Museum für Islamische Kunst als Forschungsinstitution der Islamischen Kunst im 20. Jahrhundert. (PDF; 692 kB). In: XXX. Deutscher Orientalistentag, Freiburg, 24.–28. September 2007. Ausgewählte Vorträge, herausgegeben im Auftrag der DMG von Rainer Brunner, Jens Peter Laut und Maurus Reinkowski. 2009. ISSN 1866-2943
- Stefan Weber: Zwischen Spätantike und Moderne: Zur Neukonzeption des Museums für Islamische Kunst im Pergamonmuseum. In: Jahrbuch Preußischer Kulturbesitz, Band XLVIII (2014), S. 226–257.
- Stefan Weber: Über uns und die anderen: Museen und kulturelle Bildung in der Islamdebatte. In: Jahrbuch Preußischer Kulturbesitz XLIX (2015), S. 88–109.
- Stefan Weber: Jeder kann Aleppo lieben. In: National Geographic, November (2016), S. 28–32 (Syrian Heritage Archive Project)
- Stefan Weber: Kampf um und gegen Kulturgüter im Nahen Osten – Das Fallbeispiel Syrien. In: BMVg.de: Der Reader Sicherheitspolitik, August (2016), S. 1–12 (Syrian Heritage Archive Project)
- Stefan Weber: Multaka: museum as meeting point. Refugees as guides in Berlin museums / Multaka: il museo come punto di incontro. I rifugiati come guide nei musei berlinesi. In: Archaeology & ME, Looking at archaeology in contemmpory Europe / Pensare l'archeologia nell'Europa contemporana. Bologna (2016), S. 142–45.

== See also ==
- List of Islamic art museums
