= Multaka =

Intercultural museum project

Multaka: Museum as Meeting Point is an intercultural project initiated in 2015 by four history museums in Berlin with and for Arabic- and Persian-speaking migrants and refugees. Multaka (Arabic: meeting point) was designed as an innovative project for educational exchange between refugees and other visitors from the Middle East and North Africa. Visitor-centered discussions with migrants in their languages are focused on the historical origin and history of acquisition of cultural objects, including the visitors' own understanding of their country's cultural heritage. As a response to increasing numbers of refugees and migrants, a central aim of the project has been the inclusion of Muslim visitors into museums.

From 2019 onwards, the initial Multaka project has been joined in an international network of similar initiatives at 29 museums in the United Kingdom, Italy, Greece and Switzerland.

== History ==
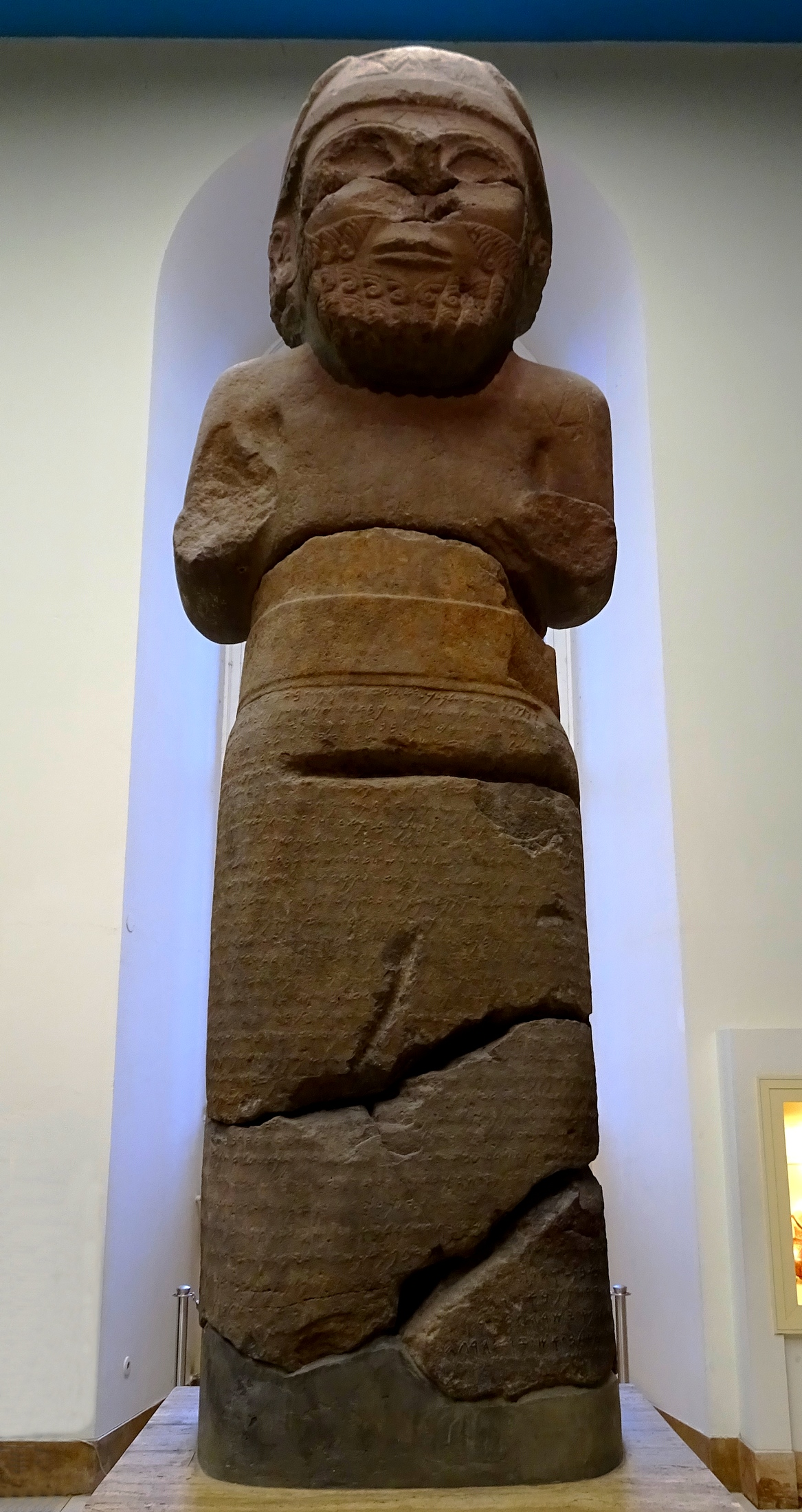
Statue of the weather god Hadad, Museum of the Ancient Near East Berlin

"Multaka: Museum as Meeting Point" is an educational programme for intercultural exchange between museum visitors with a personal history of migration from the Near East and North Africa on the one hand, and the museum staff and tour guides on the other. During discussions in the visitors' language, specially trained Multaka Guides provide information and new insights about museum items typically originating from Arab and other Middle Eastern cultures.

The project was initiated in 2015 by the Museum of Islamic Art Berlin in Germany and has since been offered free of charge in cooperation with the Museum of the Ancient Near East, the Bode Museum and the German Historical Museum. Due to the temporary closure of the first two museums located in the Pergamon Museum in October 2023, Multaka tours have also started in the Collection of Antiquities of the Altes Museum, the Egyptian Museum, the Museum for Pre- and Early History and the Alte Nationalgalerie. German history during and following World War II, dealing with war, displacement, exile and reconstruction, has been a particular focus of the guided tours in the German Historical Museum.

Designed to involve visitors into discussions about their own understanding of their country's cultural heritage, the guided tours are intended to help visitors understand the connections between the origin and history of exhibits and the presentation in the collections. The Arabic or Persian-speaking Multaka Guides thus supplement the visitors' previous knowledge in their native language and in dialogues based on mutual appreciation. For Syrian Multaka guide Kefah Ali Deeb, a statue of the Syro-Phoenician deity Hadad is an example of the origins of her homeland's religions in ancient myths.

=== Further activities ===
The project's intention to present museum objects as an expression of appreciation for Islamic cultures in an educational way for migrants has been followed by similar activities. Thus, Multaka guides have been conducting interactive games and exercises in Berlin schools and cultural centres. Central to this is how historical exchange between Europe and the Middle East has influenced Western music, clothing and science and, on the other hand, how cultural change in Muslim countries has been shaped by Western modernity.

== International network ==
In June 2019, the founding members of Multaka in Berlin and six similar museums in the United Kingdom, Italy, Greece and Switzerland started the international Multaka network. As a result, 29 museums in these countries developed similar ways of intercultural communication for visitors with a background in migration and have trained more than 100 volunteer museum guides.

== MultakaOxford ==
In 2017, the Pitt Rivers Museum and the Museum of the History of Science in Oxford, United Kingdom, started a similar collaborative and socially engaged project called MultakaOxford. Partners included local grassroots groups and organisations for refugees and asylum seekers. MultakaOxford is focused on the two museums' collections of textiles from the Arab world and on Islamic scientific instruments. Forty tour guides were selected from local communities, resulting in trained guides with different languages from Syria, Egypt, Iraq and Sudan. They have also been involved in writing new descriptions for cultural objects, in public events, and have been running social media channels. - After initial funding for the first two years had run out, MultakaOxford obtained a £1 million grant for the next five years by charitable organization Alwaleed Philanthropies from Saudi Arabia.

== Multaka in Italy, Greece and Switzerland ==
In Italy, the Egyptian Museum in Turin started a project in 2016 by training women from Egypt as intercultural guides. Since 2018, botanical gardens, archeological and art collections in Fiesole and Florence, including the Palazzo Vecchio have been operating similar tours, focusing on the botanical and cultural diversity resulting from East-Western exchange and their impact on the arts and cuisines in Italy.

In 2022, museums and archaeological sites in Athens, Greece, launched tours with intercultural guides for Greek, English, French, Arabic and Persian. The same year, the Historical Museum in the Swiss capital Bern started a new Multaka project, after having organized and trained local guides from Afghanistan, Iran, Kurdistan, Palestine and Eritrea since 2015.

== Multaka Kids in Baghdad ==
In Baghdad, museum educational workshops and guided tours for children and young people have been organized as Multaka Kids in a joint project of the Goethe-Institut and the Iraq National Museum.

== Awards and recognitions ==
For Multaka Berlin:

- Special prize for projects for cultural participation of refugees, Germany, 2016
- National winner of the competition "Landmarks in the Land of Ideas", Germany, 2016
- zenith Photo Award, Germany, 2017
- Museum and Heritage Award, London, 2018

For MultakaOxford:

- Grant as a "Meeting Point for People and Cultures" by Alwaleed Philanthropies, 2019
- Collections Trust Award, 2019
- Diversity Award for Diversifying Participation, 2020
- Museum + Heritage Community Engagement Programme of the Year Award, 2024

== Literature ==
- Gram, Rikke (2023). "Willkommen im Museum. Making and Unmaking Refugees in the Multaka Project". In Macdonald, Sharon (ed.). Doing Diversity in Museums and Heritage. A Berlin Ethnography. Bielefeld: transcript Verlag. pp. 247–260. ISBN 9783839464090.
- Annette Lӧseke: From Transcultural Entanglements to Integrated Learning Experiences? Transcultural Museum Education at Berlin's Museum of Islamic Art. In: Journal of Elementary Education. Vol. 15, Spec.Iss, 31. August 2022, ISSN 2350-4803, pp. 115–131, doi:10.18690/rei.15.Spec.Iss.115-131.2022 (um.si).
- Eva Nmeir: The Syrian Heritage Archive Project in Berlin. Ed.: ICOMOS 19th General Assembly and Scientific Symposium „Heritage and Democracy", 13-14th December 2017, New Delhi, India. 2018 (icomos.org).
- Stefan Weber: Multaka: museum as meeting point. Refugees as guides in Berlin museums / Multaka: il museo come punto di incontro. I rifugiati come guide nei musei berlinesi. In: Archaeology & ME, Looking at archaeology in contemporary Europe / Pensare l'archeologia nell'Europa contemporana. Bologna (2016), pp. 142–45.
