= Kefah Ali Deeb =

Syrian writer, artist and human rights activist (born 1982)

- كفاح علي ديب
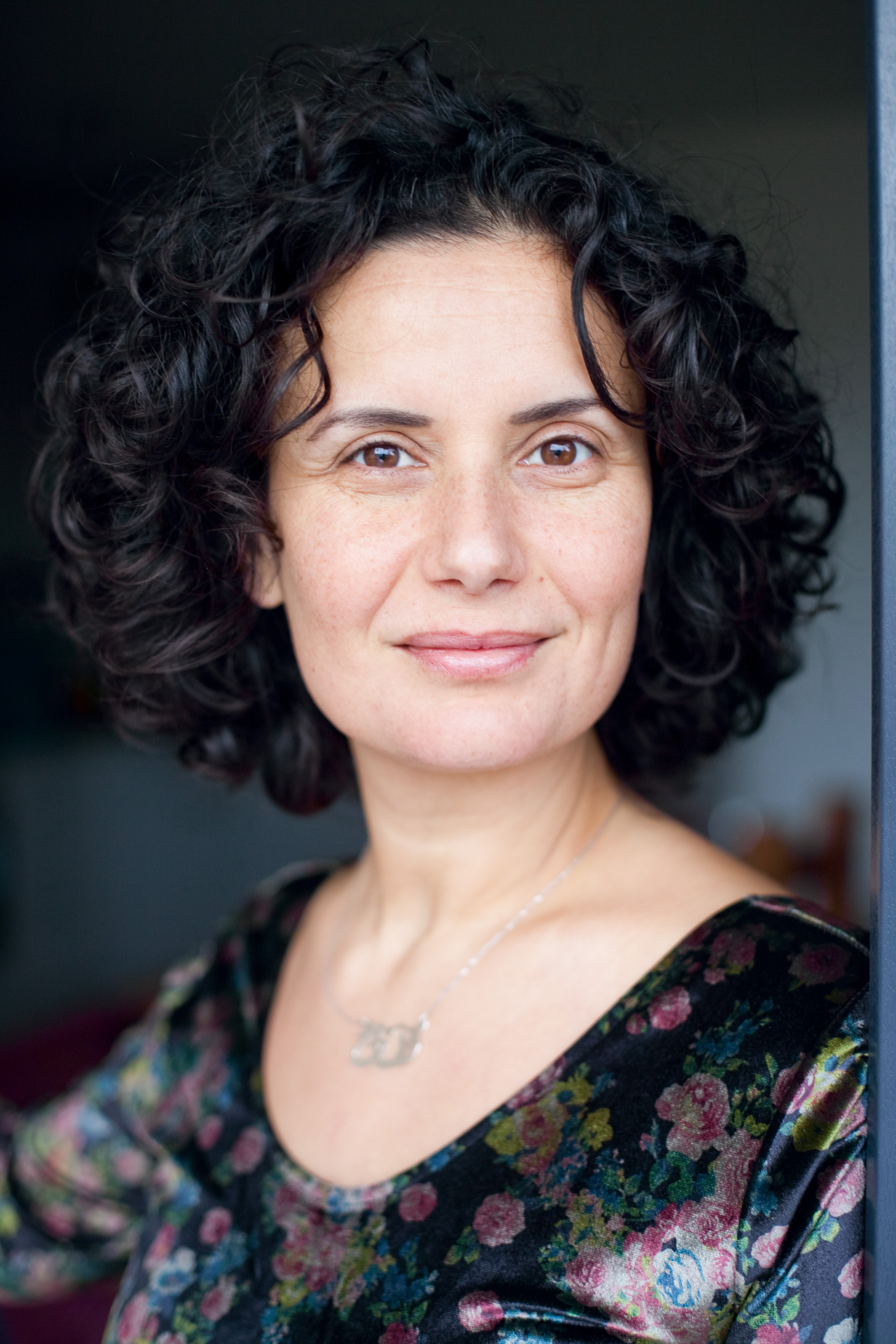
- Kefah Ali Deeb in 2019
- Born: 1982 (age 43–44); Latakia, Syria
- Education: Damascus University
- Occupations: Writer, visual artist, museum guide
- Years active: 2012–present
- Known for: Human rights activism, Multaka museum guide
- Awards: Sharjah Arab Creativity Award 2012
- Website: kefahalideeb.com

Kefah Ali Deeb (Arabic: كفاح علي ديب; born 1982 in Latakia, Syria) is a Syrian human rights activist, artist and writer. She left Syria after persecution during the Syrian war and has lived in exile in Berlin, Germany, since 2014. After the fall of the Assad regime, she declared in a January 2025 interview that she wants to return to Syria in order to take part in the country's future.

In Germany, Ali Deeb has been interviewed and published her own opinion columns about the life of migrants in newsmedia and online projects. Since 2015, she was active as a museum guide for the Multaka project, an initiative of Berlin museums to convey art historical contexts to Arabic-speaking visitors. As writer and translator she has also published several books for children in Arabic.

== Life and career ==
Having grown up in the district of Latakia on the Mediterranean coast, Ali Deeb graduated from the Department of Fine Art at the University of Damascus in 2012. After having taken part in protests against human rights violations in the context of the Arab Spring in Syria, she was arrested four times and finally fled to Germany in 2014.

In January 2014, Ali Deeb and three other Syrian women were invited by UN Women to a conference ahead of the United Nations international peace conference for Syria in Geneva (Geneva II). As a spokesperson for the Syrian Women's Initiative for Peace and Democracy, she called for Syrian women to be included in peace talks and for equality between women and men to be respected by future Syrian governments. In addition, her delegation demanded that the Syrian authorities as well as the opposition allow the unhindered access of humanitarian and medical aid to all areas, under the supervision of an independent international commission.

In 2015, her interviews and opinion columns about the difficulties of life as a refugee were published in the German weekly Die Zeit. From 2016 to 2019, Ali Deeb also wrote a series for the daily newspaper die tageszeitung about negative stereotypes towards migrants and her own difficulties in finding accommodation and learning the German language. In 2016, the Frankfurter Allgemeine Zeitung published an interview with her, writer Antje Rávic Strubel and German president Frank-Walter Steinmeier about questions relating to the future of Syria and the role of writers in shaping public opinions about migrants.

Further, Ali Deeb was editor for the Arabic version of the Handbook Germany, a multilingual information platform for migrants. The online platform We Refugees, funded by the Federal German Agency for Civic Education, published Ali Deeb’s descriptions of her escape from Syria, the loss of her home and her experiences in a refugee accommodation.

As part of the award-winning project "Multaka - Museum as Meeting Point", Ali Deeb and other Syrian and Iraqi migrants have been conducting guided tours in Arabic since 2015 in various historical museums in Berlin. One of the archaeological exhibits that she found a personal relation with is a statue of the Syro-Phoenician deity Hadad. For Ali Deeb, this is an example of the origins of her homeland's religions in ancient myths.

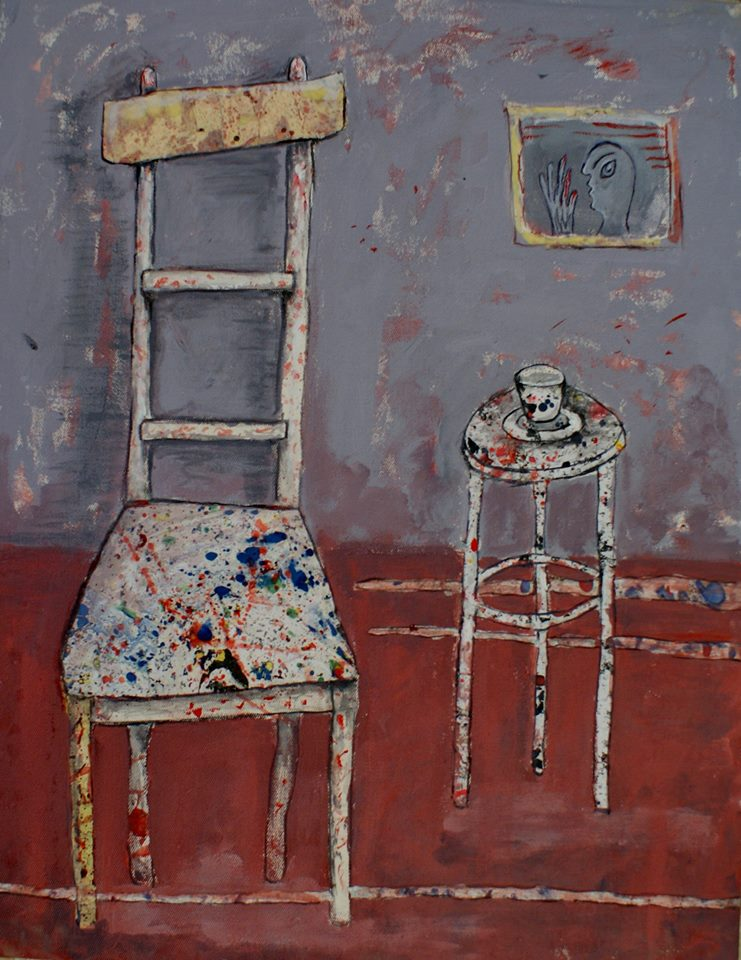
Painting of an empty chair, by Kefah Ali Deeb

In Syria, Ali Deeb's paintings were shown in several collective exhibitions at the Center for Fine Arts in Latakia. In 2016, she exhibited her paintings and graphic art at the Institut français in Bonn, Germany, along fellow Syrian artists Darin Ahmad, Fouad El-Auwad, Akram Hamza and Adnan Sharbaji. These works included a painting of an empty chair, created while she was still living in Syria, and represented her artistic vision of Syrian victims and refugees.

As a freelance writer, artist and workshop moderator, Ali Deeb continues to run art and writing workshops for children and women. During her early years in Syria, she had written stories and articles for the children's magazine “Osama”, published by the Ministry of Culture. Also, she was editor-in-chief of the Syrian children's magazine “Rainbow”, funded by Save the Children. In Germany she wrote the Arabic version of a teachers' guide for the multilingual children's book Wir Kinder aus dem ~~Flüchtlings~~Heim (We children from the ~~refugee~~ shelter). In addition to her own books for Arabic children, Ali Deeb has translated several German children's books into Arabic, promoted by the Abu Dhabi Arabic Language Center in the United Arab Emirates (UAE).

In January 2025, Die Zeit published an interview with Ali Deeb and two other migrants from Syria in Germany on the question of whether the interviewees wanted to return to Syria after the recent fall of the Assad regime. In contrast to the two Syrian men, who were sceptical about the future of their home country and plan their future in Germany, Ali Deeb explained that after ten years of waiting for the end of the regime, she wanted to return with her family to help shape the country's future.

But let's give the new situation a chance. If we want Syria to be what we want it to be, then we have to be there and take part in the reconstruction. I can't sit here and ask the Syrians there: make Syria the way I want it to be and then when it's exactly the way I want it to be, I'll come back.

— Kefah Ali Deeb, Unter uns Syrern, Die Zeit, 09.01.2025

On 7 October 2025, Ali Deeb and Syrian writer Maha Hassan reported on two projects in which Syrian women recited autobiographical texts about their flight and life in a new country. This event took place in Berlin as part of the Ibn Rushd Fund programme "Celebrating Arab Feminisms: Resistance and Resilience," which presented texts and films about women from Syria, Egypt and Palestine.

On 10 December 2025, the Stiftung Zukunft Berlin awarded the “Prize for Global Berliners” to Ali Deeb in recognition of her contributions to exchange, solidarity and social responsibility. This prize, awarded for the first time, honours individuals and organisations “who are particularly committed to social participation, democratic engagement and dialogue across cultural and national boundaries.”

== Awards ==
- Sharjah Arab Creativity Award 2012
- Prize for Global Berliners 2025 by Stiftung Zukunft Berlin

== Selected publications ==
Books in Arabic for children, titles given in English translation

- The Adventures of Kepritah, Sharjah (UAE) 2018, ISBN 978-9948-39-396-2
- Turtle Picnic, Sharjah (UAE) 2012, ISBN 978-9948-04-905-0

Translations from German to Arabic

- Julia Boehme and Julia Ginsbach, Tiger fragt: Warum?, Kalima, VAE
- Karen Christine Angermeyer and Elke Broska, Rubinia Wunderherz, Kalima, VAE
- Wolfdietrich Schnurre and Rotraut Susanne Berner, Die Prinzessin kommt um vier, Kalima, VAE

Anthology of writings on exile

- Three essays by Ali Deeb in Harald Roth, ed. (2022). Kein Land, nirgends? (in German). Bonn: Dietz. ISBN 978-3-8012-0644-4.
