= Alhambra cupola =

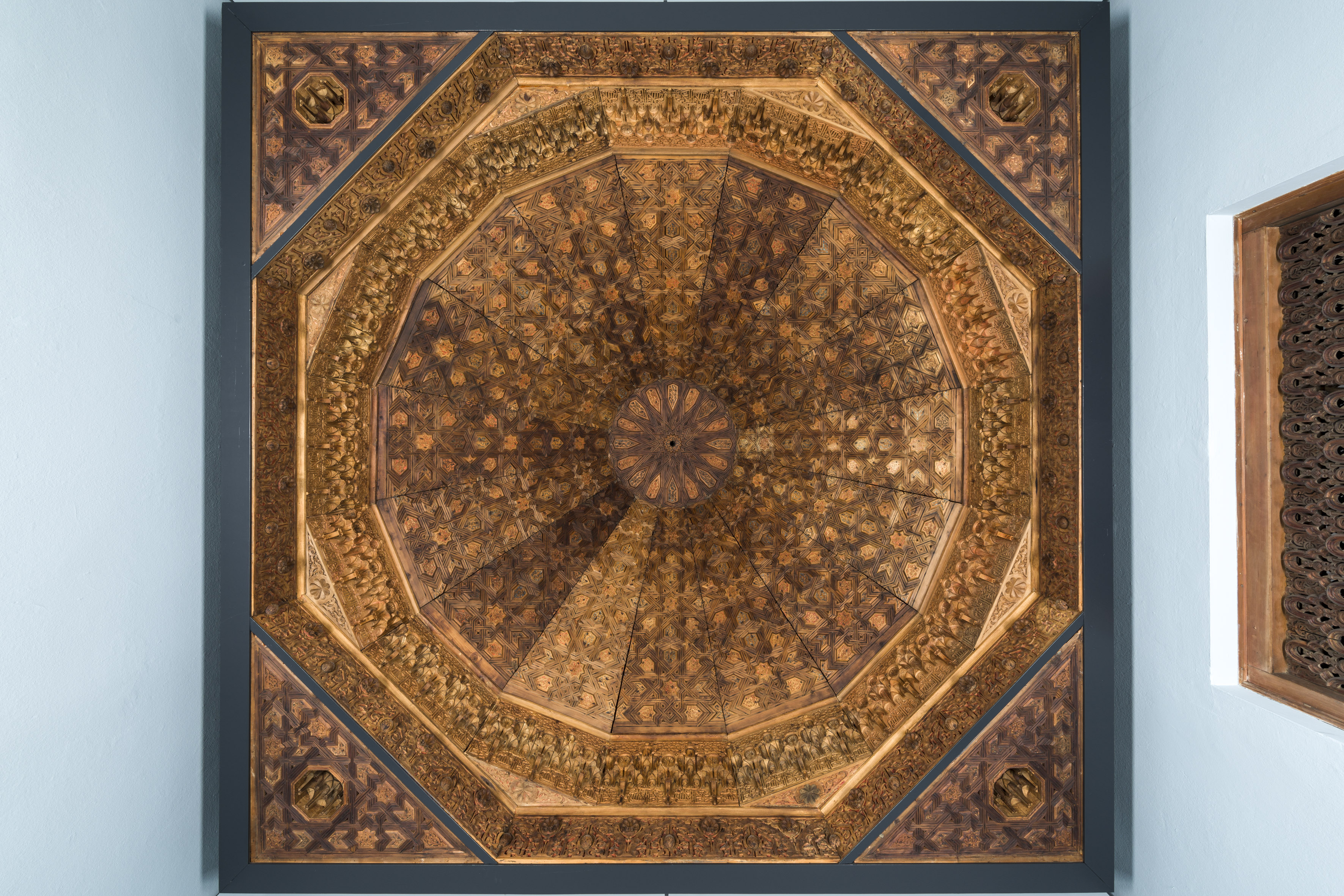
- View of the cupola from below
- Artist: Unknown
- Year: 1320
- Medium: Cedar wood, poplar wood, carved, remnants of red, blue and green paint
- Dimensions: 190 cm × 355 cm × 355 cm (75 in × 140 in × 140 in)
- Location: Museum of Islamic Art, Berlin

The Alhambra cupola was commissioned under the Nasrid ruler Muhammad III (r. 1302–1309) for the Partal Palace, a part of the Alhambra complex in Granada, Spain. The dome is constructed of wood carved with Kufic Arabic inscriptions, geometric motifs, and muqarnas (honeycomb vaulting). In the late nineteenth century, German banker Arthur von Gwinner purchased the Partal Palace and dismantled the cupola to bring it back to Germany, where it now resides in the Berlin Museum of Islamic Art.

== History ==
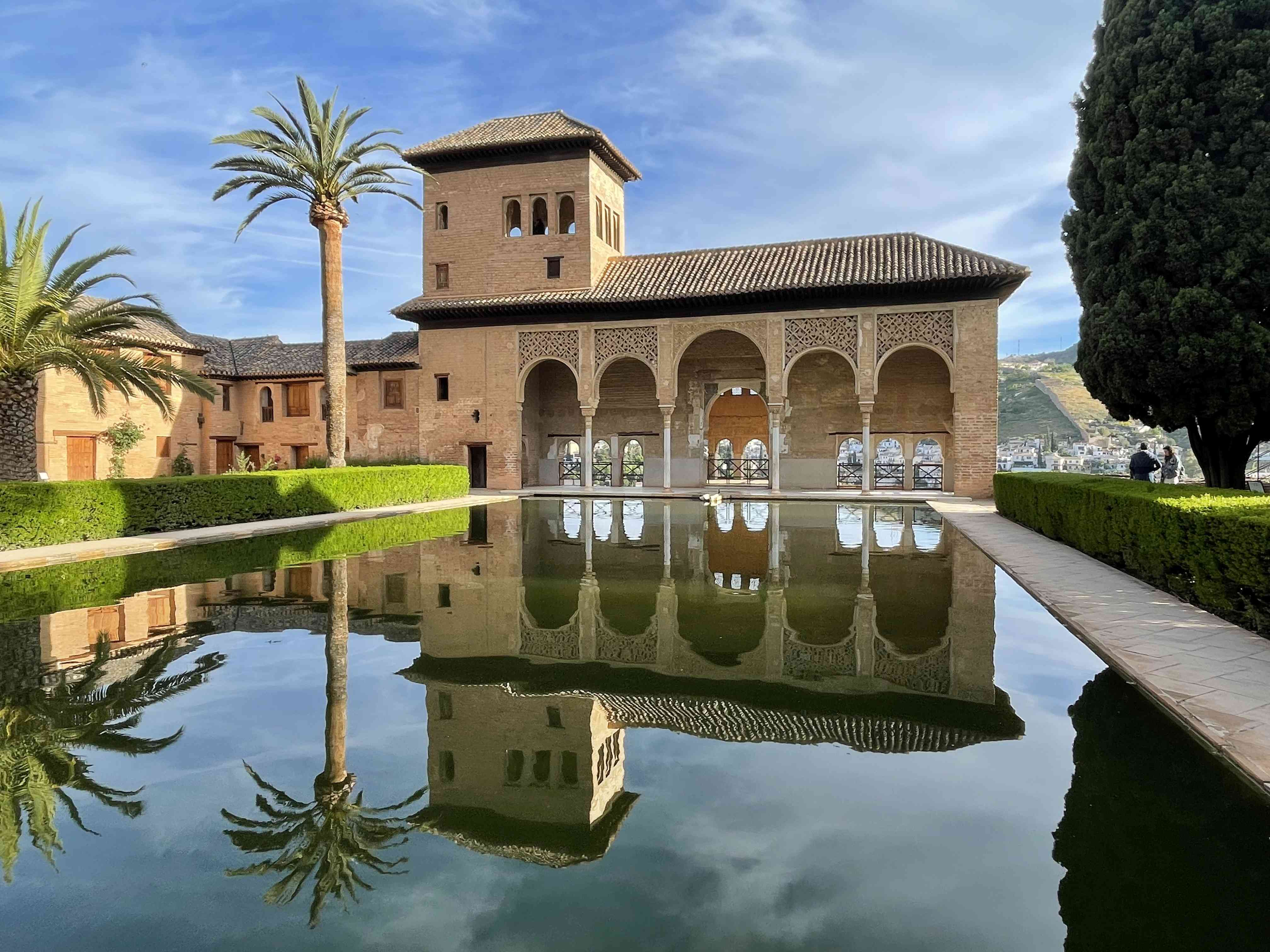
The Partal Palace in the Alhambra

The Alhambra palace is well decorated with intricate art and the Partal Palace is no different. The cupola was initially built for the mirador (lookout point) of the palace. The mirador took on the colloquial name in the 19th century of Torre de las Damas ("Ladies' Tower"). We know practically nothing about the artisans who crafted the cupola. They did not sign their work nor are there records of who they were. However, there are markings on the backs of the pieces to show how it is assembled; a motif that is recognized in some of the other woodwork in the complex and implies that some of the same artists may have worked on it.

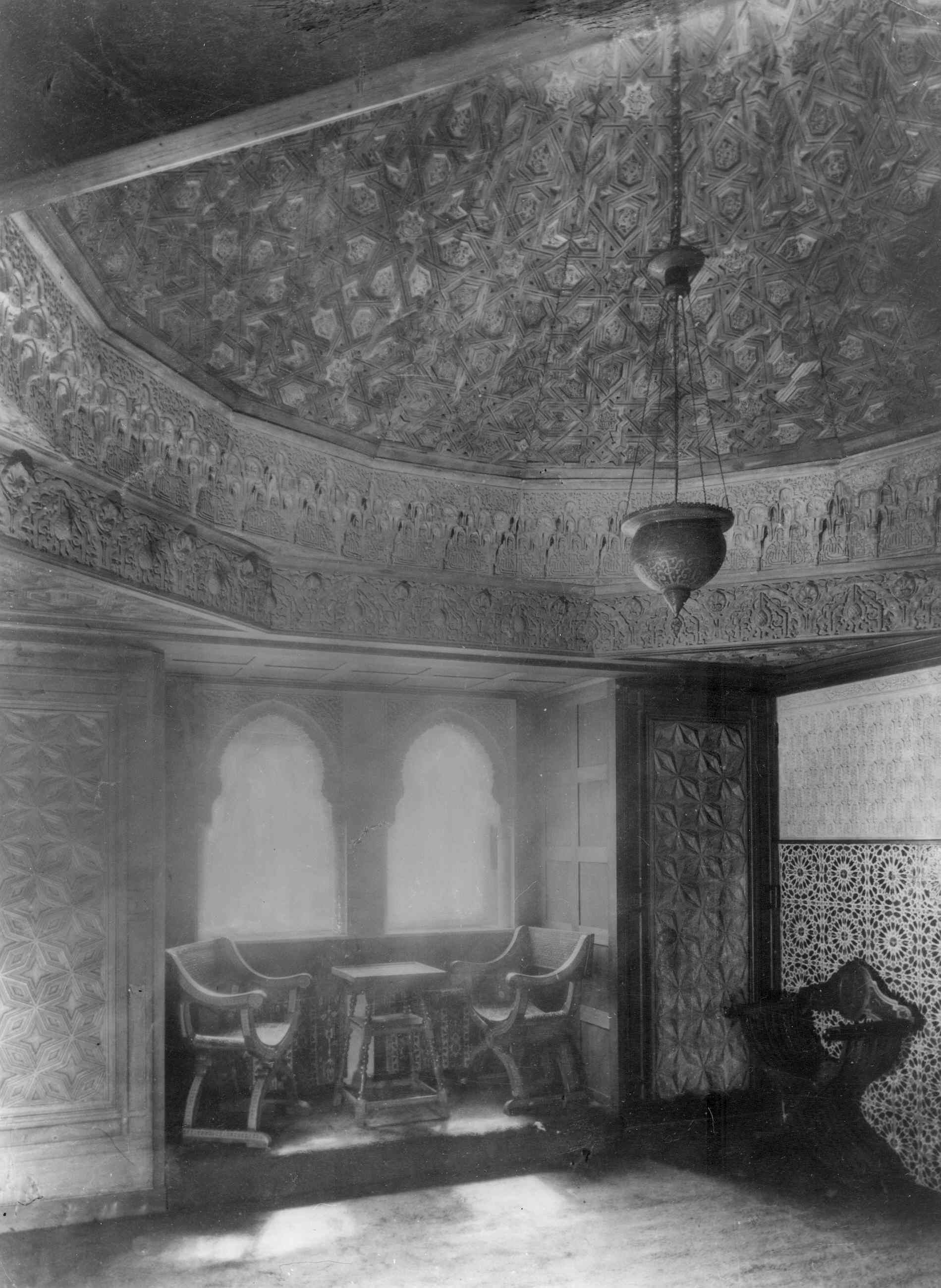
The cupola as it appeared in Arthur von Gwinner's private residence

When the Nasrid government fell, the Partal Palace was purchased by private owners and it remained in private hands until after Arthur von Gwinner. It is believed, based on records, that Arthur von Gwinner purchased the Partal with the intentions of continuing to let the artist who resided there to stay. After Owen Jones published his book Plans, Elevations, Sections and Details of the Alhambra(1842-45), London was said to have a fixation on "Alhambraesque" interiors. From the 1885 sale records, von Gwinner stated his intention to remove the "old arab ceiling" explicitly. He installed the cupola in his personal residence and even moved the cupola with him when he moved. Wolfgang Klingler, von Gwinner's grandnephew, donated the cupola to the Museum of Islamic Art History in Berlin in January 1977.

== Decoration ==
The cupola serves entirely decorative purposes, not supporting the domed ceiling at all. It is constructed of intricately carved poplar, pine, maple, fir, and cedar woods cut with precision such that the pieces meshing together.

Stylistically, the cupola is composed in the girih (Persian for "knot") technique, beginning in the center with a star that expands to the rest of the dome through more eight-pointed star "knots". Aside from its general structure, the cupola is ornately decorated. There are common motifs of Islamic architecture such as murqarnas, pinecones and shell rosettes. It also includes notable Kufic inscriptions such as wala ghaliba illa Allah ("And there is no victor except Allah") repeated geometrically within the pattern. These motifs strongly tie the cupola to Islamic architectural motifs.

The piece now appears to be just wood, but upon closer inspection, it was once covered in pigment. Within the butt joints, there are still traces of paint. Analysis of pigment in the seams of the cupola suggest that it was once brightly colored.

Butt joints and T-shape hand-forged iron nails once held together the piece. However, likely during the move to one of von Gwinner's residences, more noticeable nails were added. These nails have wider round heads. These nails that were not original to the structure are still visible today.

== Gallery ==
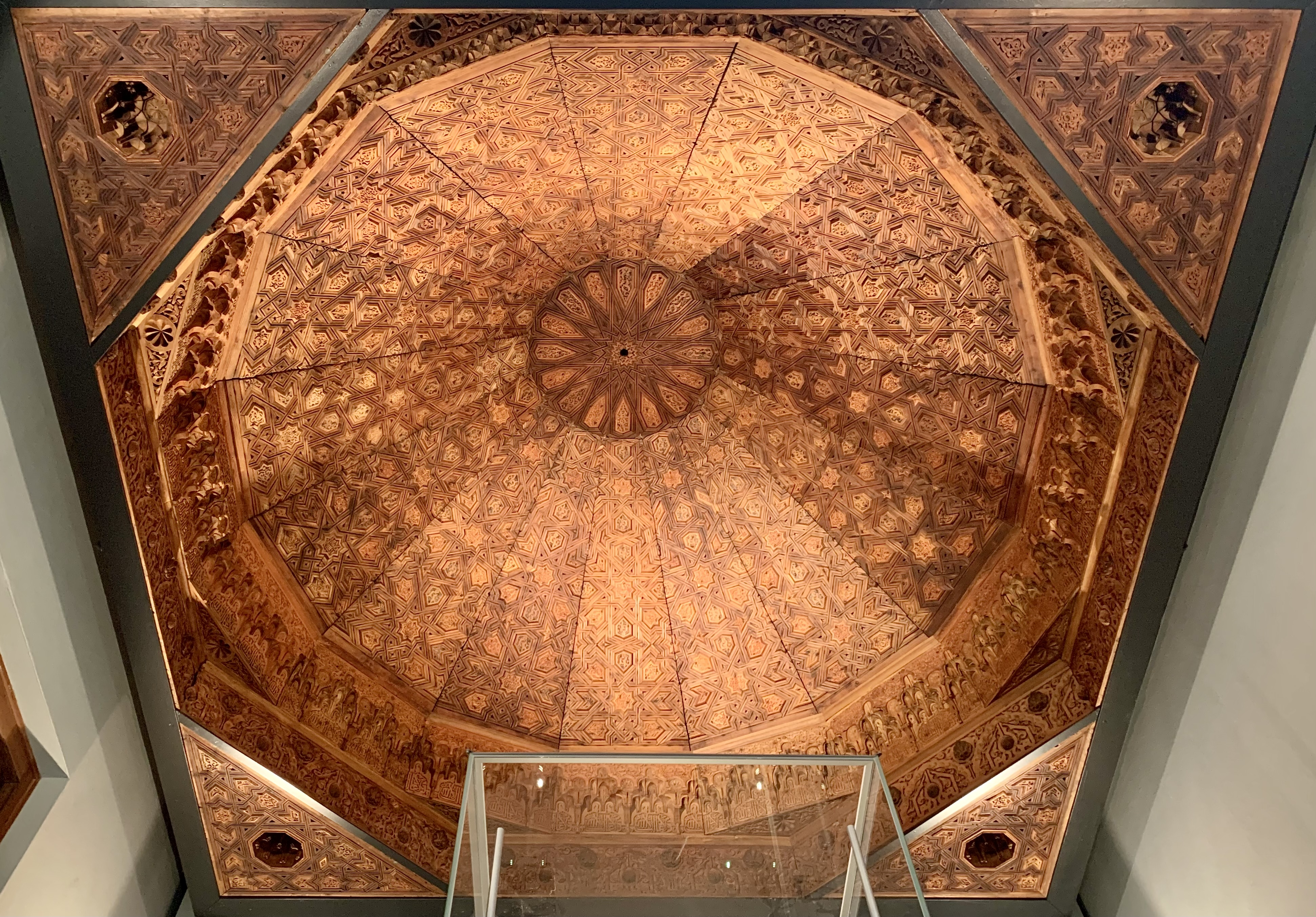
Overall view of the cupola

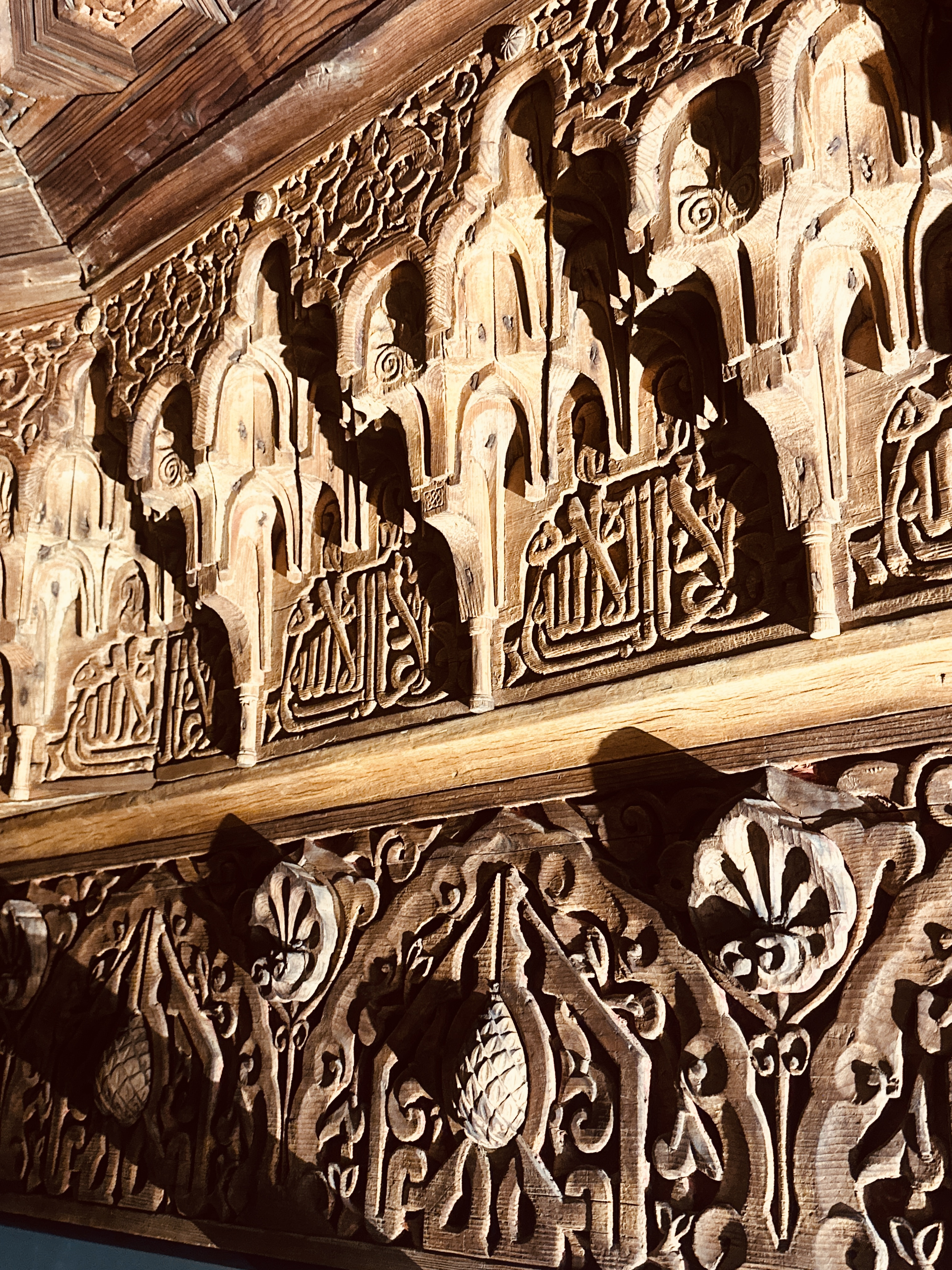
Closer view of the muqarnas at the base of the cupola

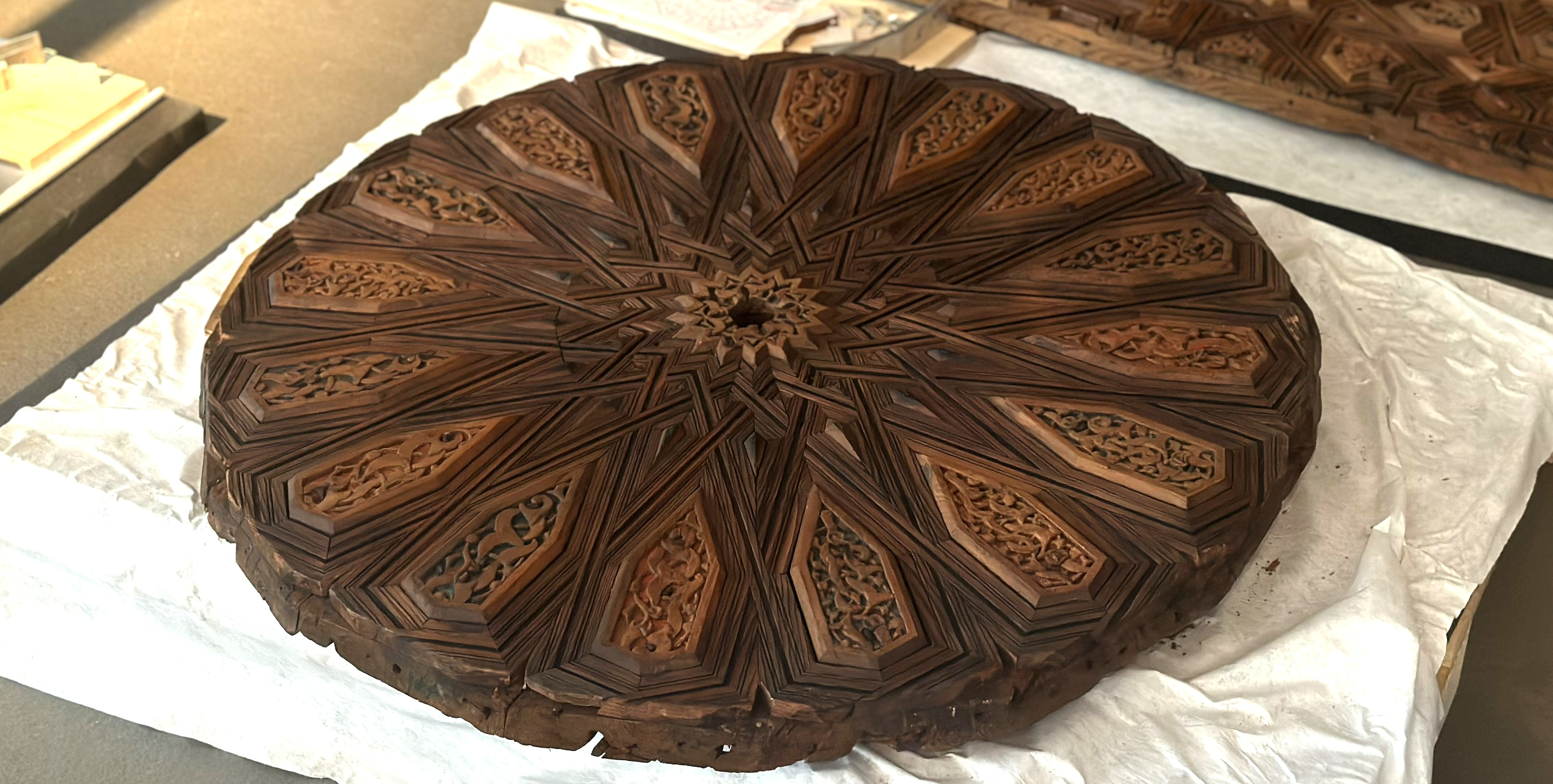
Center of the cupola

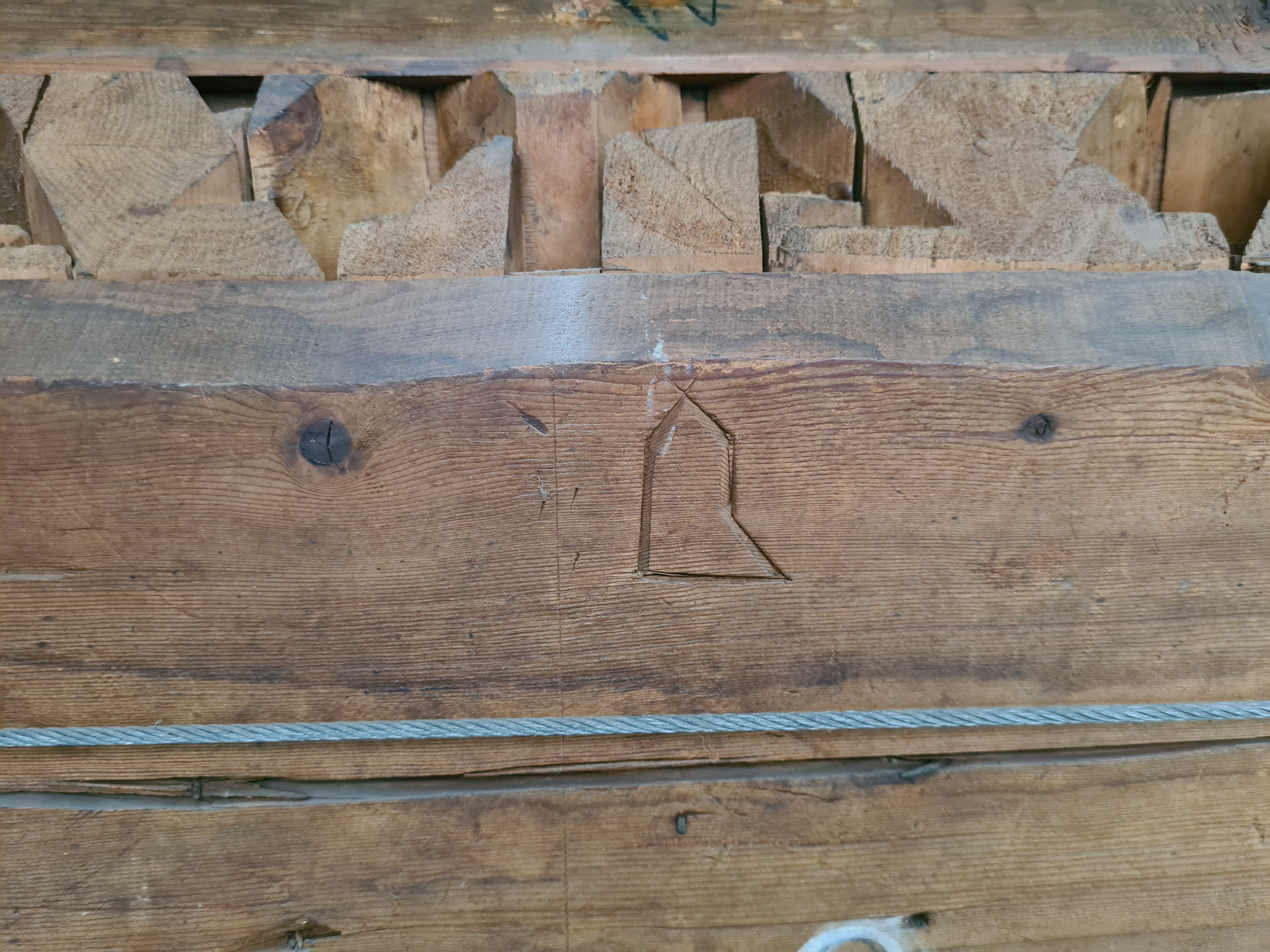
Artists' signature markings on the rear of pieces

== See also ==
- Moorish architecture
