= Darin Ahmad =

Syrian artist, poet and writer

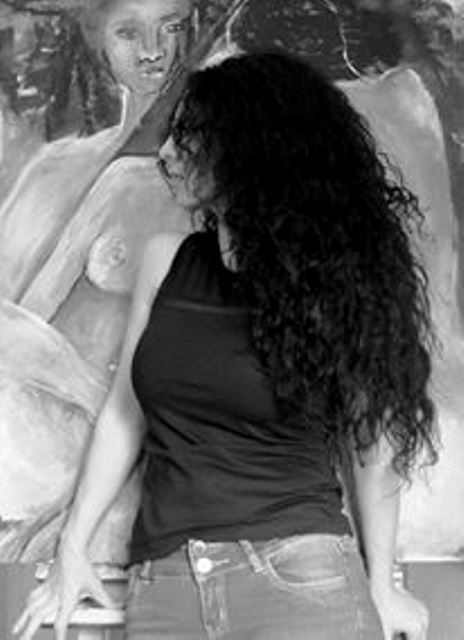
- Born: 1 January 1979 (age 47); Hama, Syria
- Education: University of Aleppo
- Website: www.darin-ahmad.com

Darin Ahmad (born 1 January 1979 in Hama, Syria) is a Syrian artist, poet and writer.

== Biography ==
After finishing school in her home town, she moved to Aleppo in 1996 to study economics. Following her graduation from the University of Aleppo in July 2004, she lived in Damascus and worked as a web designer and editor for the internet magazine Maaber. Since the winter of 2012, Darin Ahmad has lived with her family in Berlin. In addition to her poetry, she has also been painting since 2015. Her paintings were featured in Alitihad Culture Newspaper in July 2017, BeiNNehreen Newspaper in October 2018 and Mirit Magazine in May 2019, following an article about her in Al-Arab Newspaper in September 2016 and an interview with eSyria published in March 2018. In June 2019, she published an article in The New Arab entitled 'This day is still mine', and in August 2019, the article 'Need of the central'. Further articles and poems have been published in Maaber Magazine from 2004 to the present day.

== Exhibitions ==
Darin Ahmad first exhibited her work in the group show Fluchtpunkt, alongside Kefah Ali Deeb, Fouad El-Auwad, Akram Hamza and Adnan Sharbaji, at the Institut Français in Bonn from May to July 2016. The exhibition was organised with the support of ArtDialog e. V. and the German-Arabic Poetry Salon, and was held under the patronage of the Mayor of Bonn, Ashok Sridharan.

A further exhibition, Two Faces, held jointly with Frances Aviva Blane, was shown at the residence of the German ambassador in London from July 2016 to January 2017. In February and March 2017, Ahmad's work was on view at the Crypt Gallery in London as part of the exhibition Radical Love: Female Lust. Her work was also permanently exhibited at the Palais am Festungsgraben in Berlin-Mitte, at the offices of Kiron Open Higher Education, from January 2017 to May 2019.
