= Friedrich Sarre =

German Orientalist, archaeologist and art historian

Friedrich Paul Theodor Sarre (22 June 1865, in Berlin – 31 May 1945, in Neubabelsberg) was a German Orientalist, archaeologist and art historian who amassed a collection of Islamic art.

In 1895-96, inspired by Carl Humann, he conducted archaeological research in Phrygia, Lycaonia, and Pisidia, investigating architectural monuments and collecting epigraphic material. During two archaeological field seasons from 1911 to 1913 he excavated at Samarra, the 9th-century capital of the Abbasid dynasty, with Ernst Herzfeld. The two men published their findings in "Archäologische Reise im Euphrat-und Tigris Gebeit" ("Archaeological journey in the Euphrates and Tigris region").

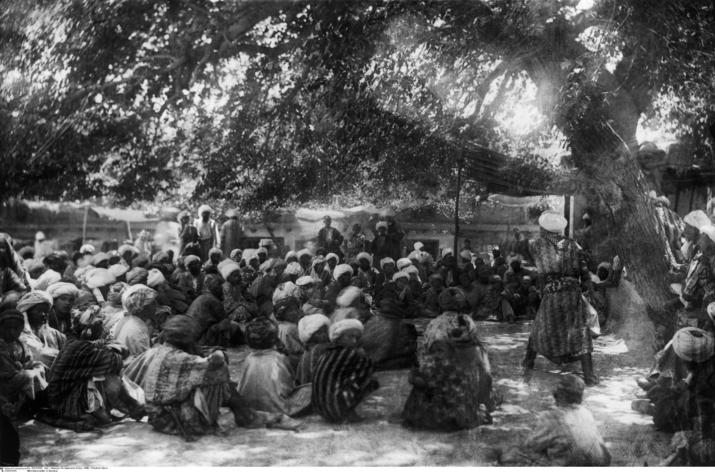
Fairy-tale narrator (photographed 1898 in Bukhara by Friedrich Sarre)

He collected art from throughout the Middle East, especially from Persia and Constantinople. These items were put on exhibition in Berlin (1899), and later Paris at the Exposition des arts musulmans (1903). He donated most of his collection to the Kaiser Friedrich Museum in Berlin, where from 1921 to 1931 he was the director of its "Islamic department".

== Selected works ==
- Reise in Kleinasien-sommer 1895--forschungen zur Seldjukishin Kunst und Geographie des Landes, 1896 – Travel in Asia Minor, Summer 1895. Research of Seljuq art and geography of the country.
- Transkaukasien, Persien, Mesopotamien, Transkaspien, 1899 – Transcaucasia, Persia, Mesopotamia, Trans-Caspia.
- Denkmäler persischer Baukunst : geschichtliche Untersuchung und Aufnahme muhammedanischer Backsteinbauten in Vorderasien und Persien (1901 1910) – Monuments of Persian architecture; historical investigations and records of Islamic brick buildings in Asia Minor and Persia.
- Erzeugnisse islamischer kunst (Volume 1–2, with Eugen Mittwoch) 1906–1909.
- Archäologische Reise im Euphrat- und Tigris-Gebiet (4 volumes, with Ernst Herzfeld; Max van Berchem), 1911–1920.
- Die Kunst des alten Persien, 1922 – The art of ancient Persia.

Works by Sarre that have been published in English:

- "Oriental carpet designs in full color" (with Hermann Trenkwald); New York : Dover Publications, ©1979. Originally published in two volumes, 1926 and 1929, by Anton Schroll & Co., Vienna.
- "Islamic bookbindings", (with F D O'Byrne); London, K. Paul, Trench, Trubner & co., ltd. (1923).
