= Stefan Weber (orientalist) =

Stefan Weber (born 17 October 1967, in Aachen) is a German Orientalist and director of the Museum of Islamic Art (Museum für Islamische Kunst) at the Pergamon Museum in Berlin, Germany. Previously, he was assistant professor of material history at the Institute for the Study of Muslim Civilisations of Aga Khan University in London.

== Career ==
Weber matriculated in Islamic studies (Arabic, Persian, Turkish and History of Islamic art) at Bonn University in 1990 and finished as Magister in 1996. After university he worked at the German Archaeological Institute in Damascus. In 2001 he received a doctorate from the University of Berlin and moved to Beirut as staff member of the Deutsche Morgenländische Gesellschaft (German Oriental Society).

In 2007 he became assistant professor of material history at the Institute for the Study of Muslim Civilisations of Aga Khan University in London. In July 2008 he was appointed as director of the Pergamon Museum of Islamic Art in Berlin by the Prussian Cultural Heritage Foundation and holds this position since spring 2009.

Stefan Weber chaired several international and interdisciplinary projects. He specializes in the architectural history of Syria during the Ottoman period.

== Publications ==
- Zeugnisse Kulturellen Wandels: Stadt, Architektur und Gesellschaft des osmanischen Damaskus im 19. und frühen 20. Jahrhundert. Ph.D. Thesis, Freie Universität Berlin, 2001 (Online version)
- "Das Anfang vom Ende. Der Wandel bemalter Holzvertäfelungen in Damaskus des 18. und 19. Jahrhunderts." In Julia Gonnella, Jens Kröger: Angels, Peonies, and Fabulous Creatures: The Aleppo Room in Berlin. International Symposium of the Museum für Islamische Kunst - Staatliche Museen zu Berlin 12.-14. April 2002, pp. 153–164. ISBN 978-3-930454-82-2
- The Empire in the City: Arab Provincial Capitals in the Late Ottoman Empire. Beiruter Texte und Studien 88, Beirut 2002 (as editor with J. Hanssen, Th. Philipp)
- Damascus: Ottoman Modernity and Urban Transformation (1808–1918). Aarhus University Press, Aarhus 2009, ISBN 978-8779344242.
