= Torre de la Cautiva =

Tower and palace structure in the Alhambra of Granada

Coordinates: 37°10′34.3″N 3°35′10.8″W

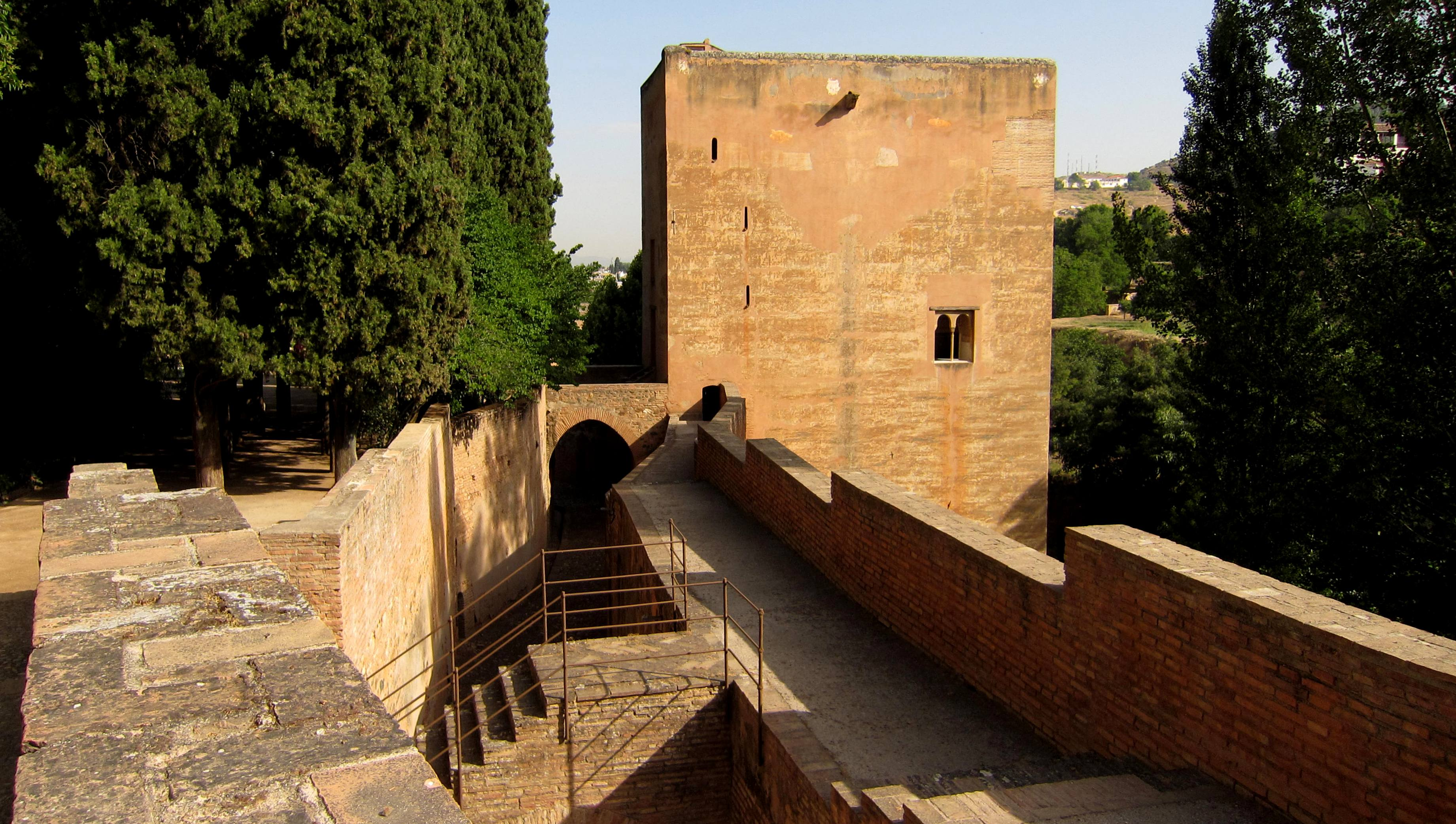
Exterior view of the tower

The Torre de la Cautiva (Spanish: Torre de la Cautiva, lit. 'tower of the captive [woman]') is a tower in the walls of the Alhambra in Granada, Spain. It is one of several towers along the Alhambra's northern wall which were converted into a small palatial residence in the 14th century. It is considered an exceptional example of Nasrid domestic architecture from this period.

== Name ==
The Spanish name Torre de la Cautiva, meaning 'Tower of the Captive (Lady)', is a "fanciful" name that does not have a historical reasoning. The Arabic inscriptions inside the tower refer to it as the qalaḥurra, meaning a "tower palace" or a military tower used as a dwelling.

== Historical background ==
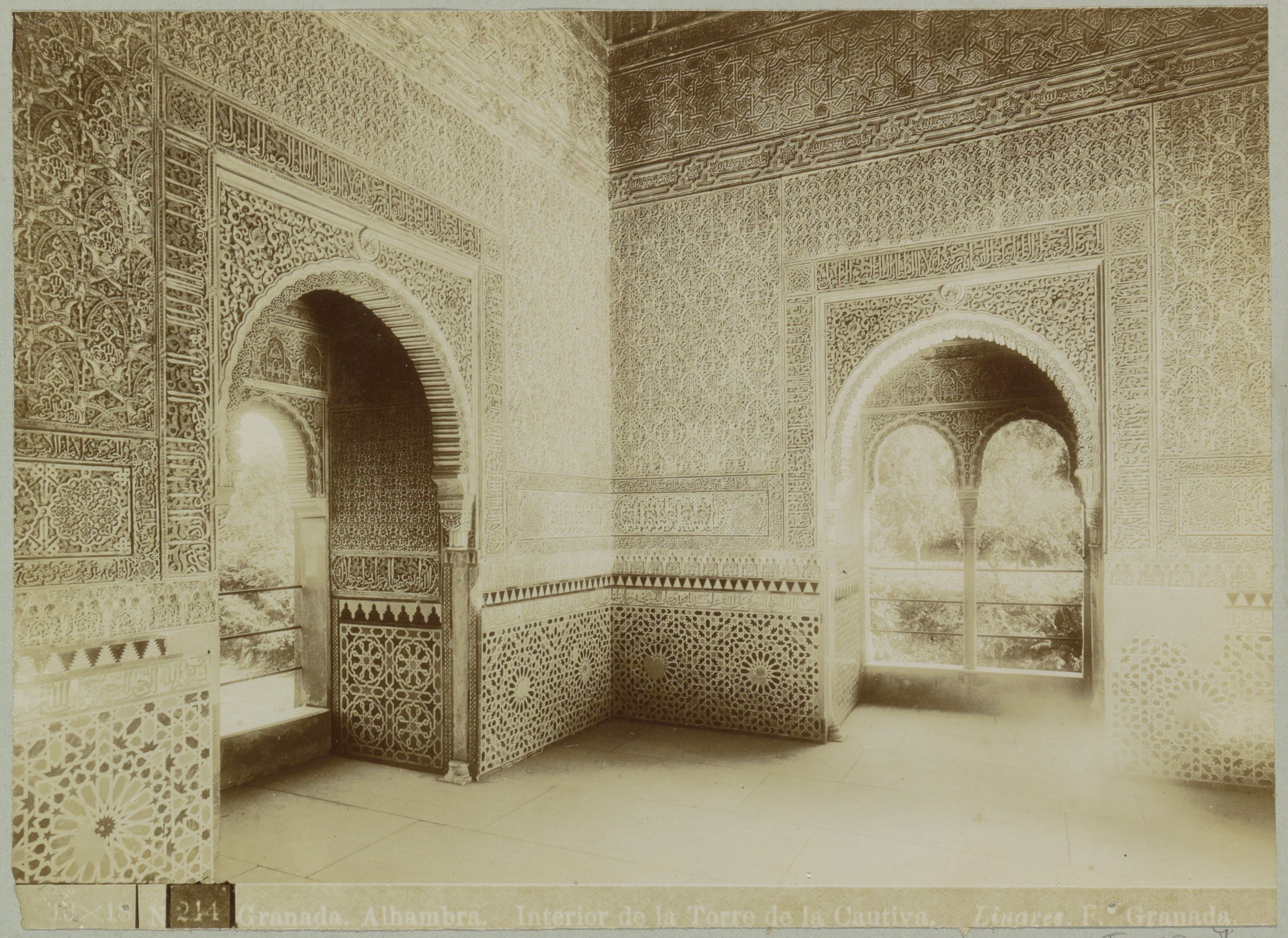
Interior of the tower in a photo from around 1860–1900

The tower is one of several towers along the northern wall of the Alhambra which were converted into residences or other non-military functions during the reign of Yusuf I (r. 1333–1354). The tower itself probably already existed before this and was rebuilt or modified by Yusuf I. The exact date of the tower's construction or conversion is not known, but because it contains poems by Ibn al-Jayyab it was most likely completed before this poet's death in 1349. Other examples of such towers from Yusuf I's reign include the tower known as the Peinador de la Reina (to which Charles V added royal apartments in 1528), the oratorio (oratory or prayer room) of the Partal Palace, and the Comares Tower or Hall of the Ambassadors in the Comares Palace. The Torre de la Cautiva was damaged by fire at some point in its history and the floor and ceiling were later restored in the 19th century.

== Description ==
The tower is integrated into the northern wall of the Alhambra complex. It is located between the Torre del Qadi to the west and the Torre de las Infantas to the east. The entrance to the tower, on its south side, is a narrow passage that bends 90 degrees four times before reaching the first hall. A staircase branching off the side of the entrance passage leads to the second floor. The interior of the tower consists of two halls of square shape. The first hall is essentially a tiny courtyard with a skylight opening and thus serving as a light well. On one side of this courtyard-hall is the arch of the entrance and on the other three sides is a portico or gallery structure with arches supported by two pillars. On the second floor, the light well of the courtyard is surrounded by several chambers which connect to it through small windows. The second hall, at the north end of the tower, is similar to the Hall of the Ambassadors in the Comares Palace but on a smaller scale. It has deep niches on three sides which contain double windows with views onto the landscape below. The hall is covered by a high vaulted ceiling of wood which dates from its 19th-century restoration. The marble floor also dates from the 19th-century restoration.

The interior of the tower is decorated with extensive carved stucco decoration from the Nasrid period, similar to the other palaces of the Alhambra. This decoration was originally enhanced with polychromy but has lost its colours over time. Tapestries or other furnishings were probably hanged on some of the walls during the Nasrid period. The tower's most notable decoration is the mosaic tilework (zellij) along its lower walls. Tile pieces of different colours were arranged to form geometric patterns as well as lines of Arabic calligraphic inscriptions running horizontally above them. Among the different colours of the tile pieces is a purple colour which is unique in the decoration of this era. The Arabic inscriptions of the tilework include four long poems by Ibn al-Jayyab, a grand vizier of Yusuf I and the predecessor of Ibn al-Khatib, which praise the qualities of the building. One inscription also contains a chapter from the Qur'an, Surah 112, which invokes the unity of God.

Interior of the tower

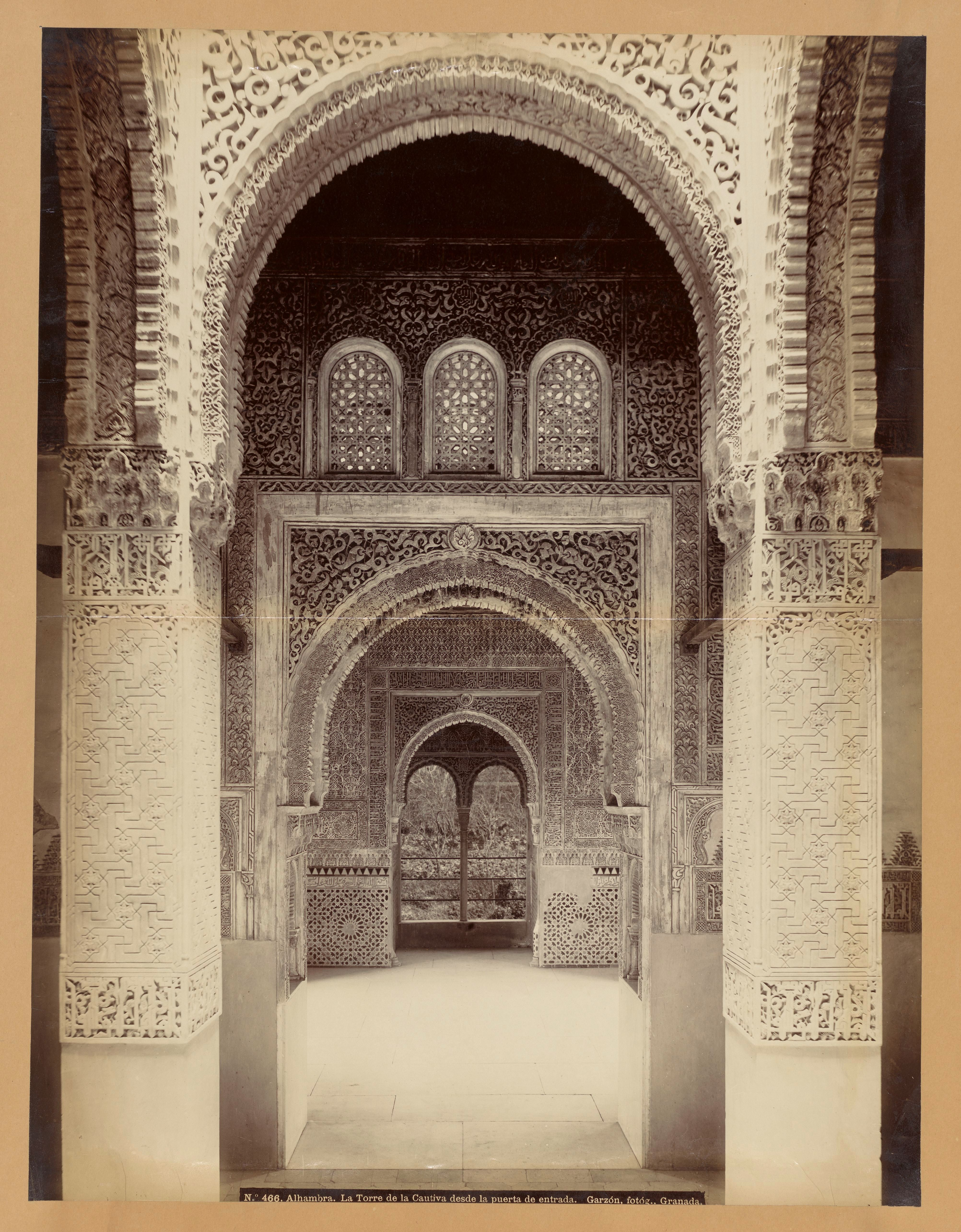
The first hall (courtyard) and its pillars, looking north towards the second hall (photo from 1870–1895)

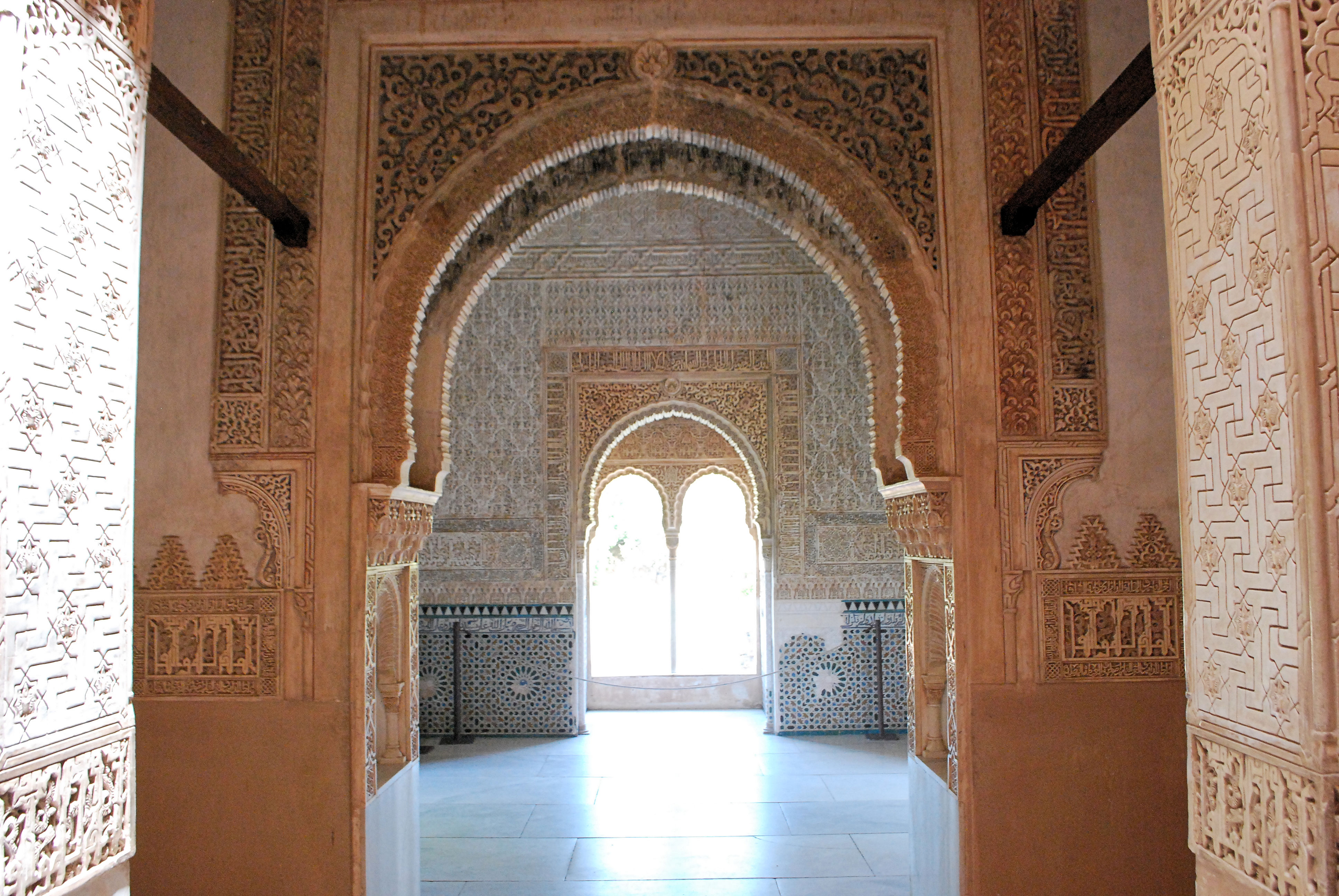
Interior of the tower, looking north from the courtyard hall towards the second hall (present-day photo)

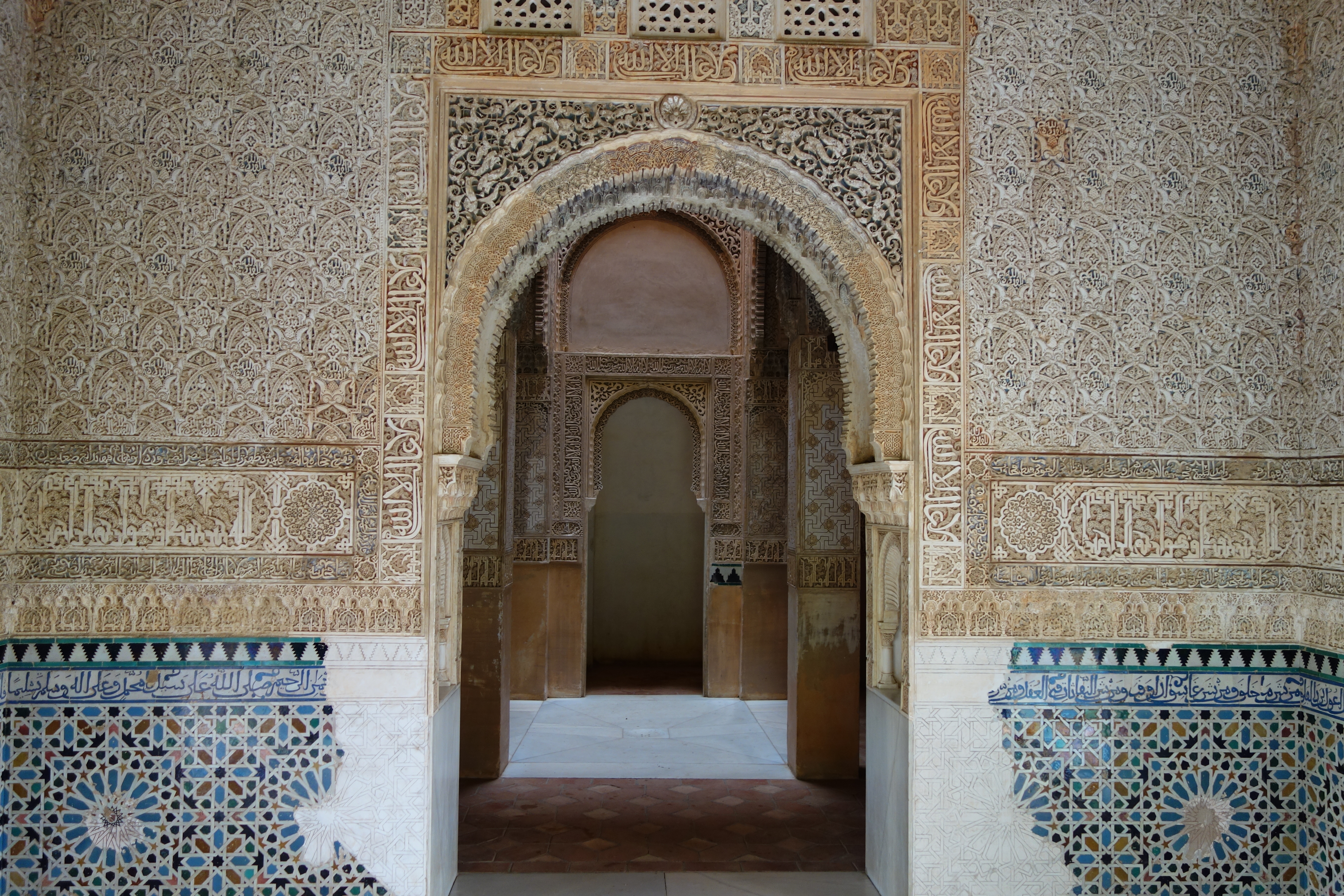
View from the second hall looking back towards the first hall and the entrance

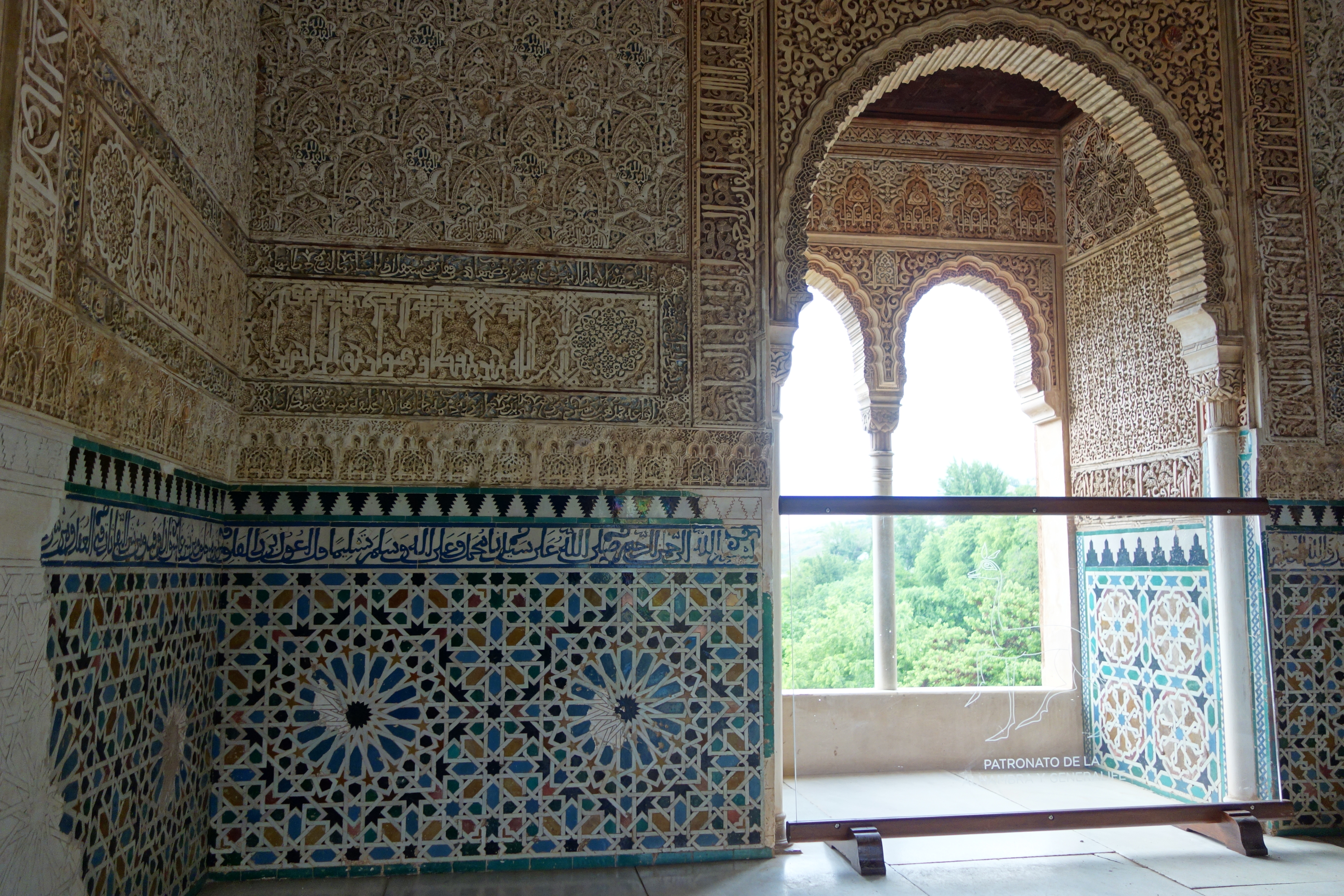
Vew of decoration on the lower walls and one of the side windows in the second hall

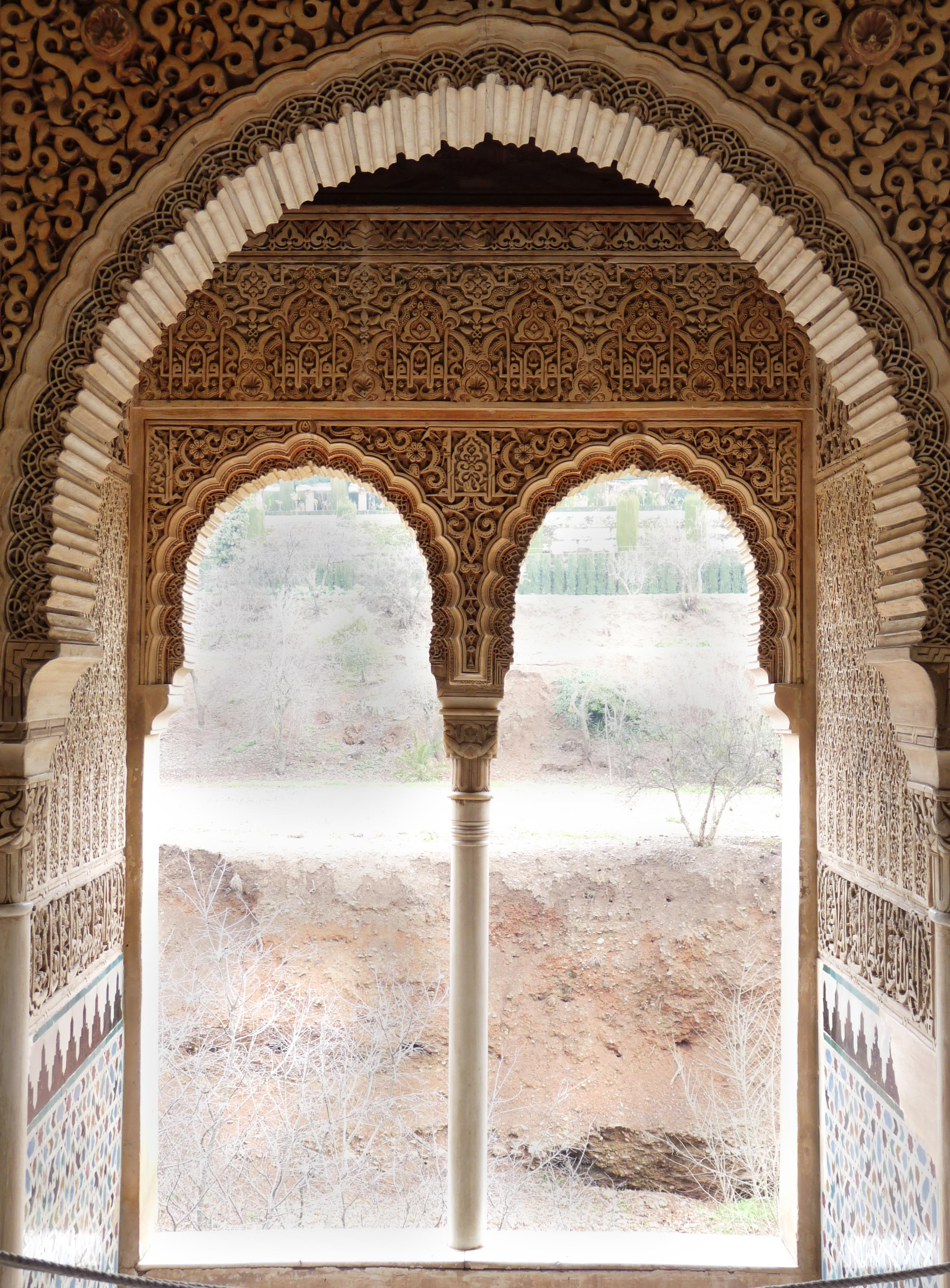
Detail of the central window niche in the second hall

This tower, along with the other small towers that Yusuf I refurbished and decorated, represented a new type of design in Nasrid architecture. Unlike other Nasrid palaces like the Partal or the Comares Palace, they have no relationship to an outdoor courtyard or garden. Instead, they are completely self-contained and isolated. However, they do have windows offering scenic views of the city and landscape beyond the Alhambra, which may suggest that they were an evolution of the mirador or lookout room that can be found in many of the other Nasrid palaces and pavilions of the era. A later example of this type of tower palace – and one of the last major Nasrid constructions in the Alhambra – is the Torre de las Infantas which was built or rebuilt by Muhammad VII towards the end of the 14th century.
