= Partal Palace =

Historic palace inside the Alhambra of Granada, Spain

- Palacio del Partal
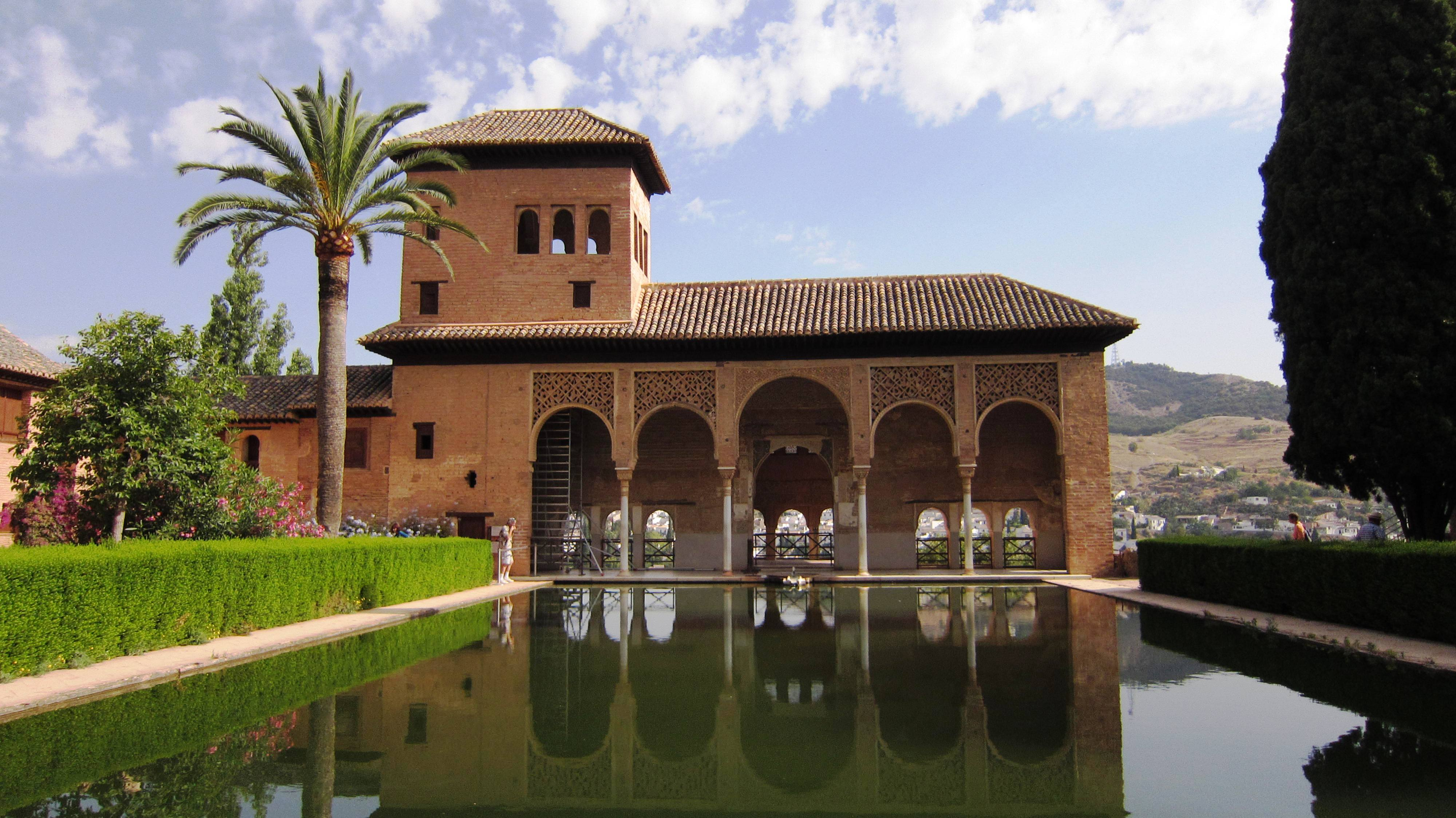

General information
- Type: Palace
- Architectural style: Moorish (Nasrid period)
- Location: Alhambra, Granada, Spain
- Coordinates: 37.17737°N 3.58855°W

Technical details
- Material: brick, wood

Partal Palace (Spanish: El Palacio del Partal ) is a palatial structure inside the Alhambra fortress complex located in Granada, Spain. It was originally built in the early 14th century by the Nasrid ruler Muhammad III, making it the oldest surviving palatial structure in the Alhambra.

== Etymology ==
The name Partal comes from Arabic al-Barṭal or al-Burtāl (البرطل or البرطال). This word was an Arabisation of the Latin word portale ('portal') that was used in Old Castilian to mean "portico".

== History ==
The Partal Palace was built by the Nasrid ruler Muhammad III who ruled the Emirate of Granada, the last Muslim state in Al-Andalus (the Iberian Peninsula), from 1302 to 1309. This dating makes it the oldest remaining palace in the Alhambra today. It was also the first of several palaces that were eventually built along the northern perimeter of the Alhambra. Another palace, called the Palacio del Partal Alto by archeologists, once stood to the south in an area now occupied by gardens. Though traditionally attributed to Yusuf III (r. 1408–1417), it was most likely built by Muhammad III's predecessor, Muhammad II (r. 1273–1302). The space between the Palacio del Partal Alto to the south and the outer Alhambra walls to the north was a large garden, the Riyad as-Sayyid ("Garden of the Sayyid", Sayyid being an honorific used by the Nasrids), which may have initially stretched from the Comares Palace in the west to the Torre de las Infantas in the east. Muhammad III built the Partal Palace in this garden area. He re-used a former fortification tower and turned it into a mirador (lookout chamber) integrated into a decorated building.

The Partal Palace is one of the structures that has undergone the most alterations after the Nasrid era. Unlike the neighboring Comares Palace and Palace of the Lions, which were used by Spanish monarchs after the conquest of 1492, the Partal Palace passed under private ownership and was remodeled into a residence by its owners. It was only ceded to the Spanish government in 1891 and then incorporated into the rest of the Alhambra historical site. Over the course of the 20th century it underwent multiple restorations by archeologists and architects in charge of the Alhambra. Two large 14th-century marble lions, originating from the now-demolished Maristan in the Albaicin, had previously been moved to the Partal Palace but were removed in the 1890s to be restored and preserved. They are now kept at the Alhambra Museum. Between 1923 and 1924 Leopoldo Torres Balbás restored and partly rebuilt the portico façade, revealing and reconstituting the sebka stucco decoration above the arches. Francisco Prieto Moreno replaced the portico's brick pillars with slender Nasrid-style marble columns in 1965.

== Description ==
=== Palacio del Pórtico and the Torre de las Damas ===
The palace is only partly preserved, with only the tower and portico on its north side remaining. According to some scholarly views, this was originally part of an enclosed rectangular courtyard rather than the open garden it appears as today. It would have thus had the typical layout seen in other palaces nearby: a private courtyard centered on a large reflective pool with porticoes at either end and a mirador tower at one end that looked down on the city from the edge of the palace walls. Another scholarly view holds that the Partal Palace never had an enclosed courtyard, and consisted mainly of the present structure facing an open landscape with the pool. This arrangement would differ from other Nasrid palaces, but it had precedents in earlier Almohad-era country estates such as the Buḥayra of Seville (built in 1171–1172). In this scenario, the Partal Palace would have been an essentially outdoor space that could be enjoyed during good weather.

The main remaining structure today is also known as the Palacio del Pórtico. Both the arched façade of the external portico and the interior walls are carved or covered with intricate stucco decoration from the time of Muhammad III. Much of this decoration was originally painted with colours, though much of this has faded over time. The calligraphic inscriptions in the decoration include poems by Ibn al-Jayyab (d. 1349) dedicated to Muhammad III. The portico was originally supported on brick pillars, but these were replaced in the 20th century by slender marble columns as seen today. The palace still preserves its large reflecting pool in front of the portico. Behind the portico is a chamber projecting outwards and northwards from the Alhambra walls. This acted as a mirador, similar to the Sala Regia in the Generalife, offering views over the city below through the windows on its three sides. Windows also lined other parts of the building. As a result of its open portico and many windows, scholar Arnold Felix describes it as the most "transparent" building in the Islamic architecture of Al-Andalus.

The palace structure also includes the Torre de las Damas (Tower of the Ladies), a tower to the left (or west) of the main portico and mirador. Its top floor had two chambers. The original wooden cupola ceiling inside the larger chamber was dismantled and moved by its last private owner, Arthur von Gwinner, around the beginning of the 20th century. It is now preserved at the Museum für Islamische Kunst, the Islamic art section of the Pergamon Museum in Berlin, Germany. The other chamber is covered by a small dome carved with muqarnas (or mocárabes in Spanish), which is the oldest muqarnas vault in the Alhambra today.

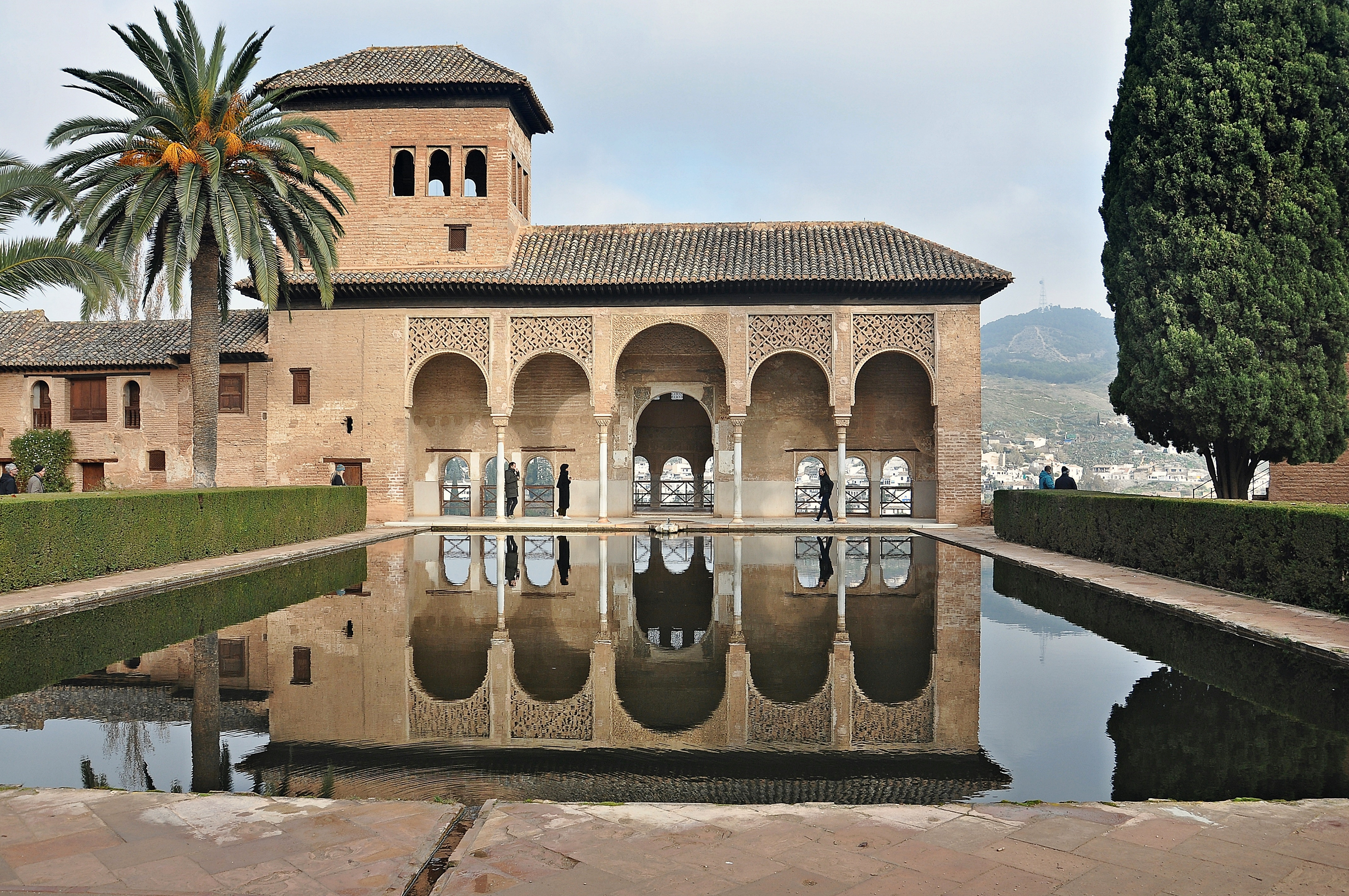
The portico of the palace, with the Torre de las Damas rising on the left

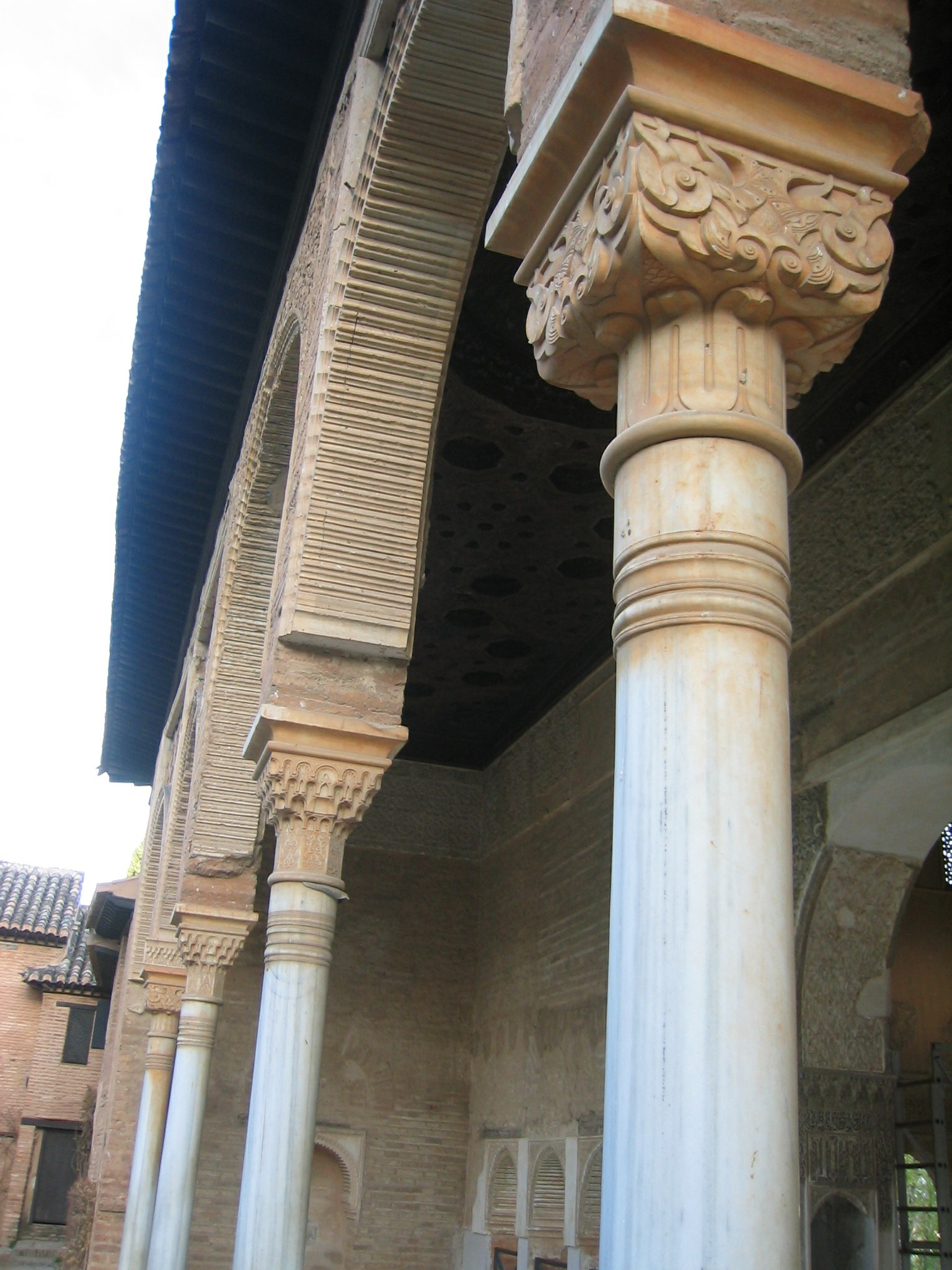
Columns of the portico

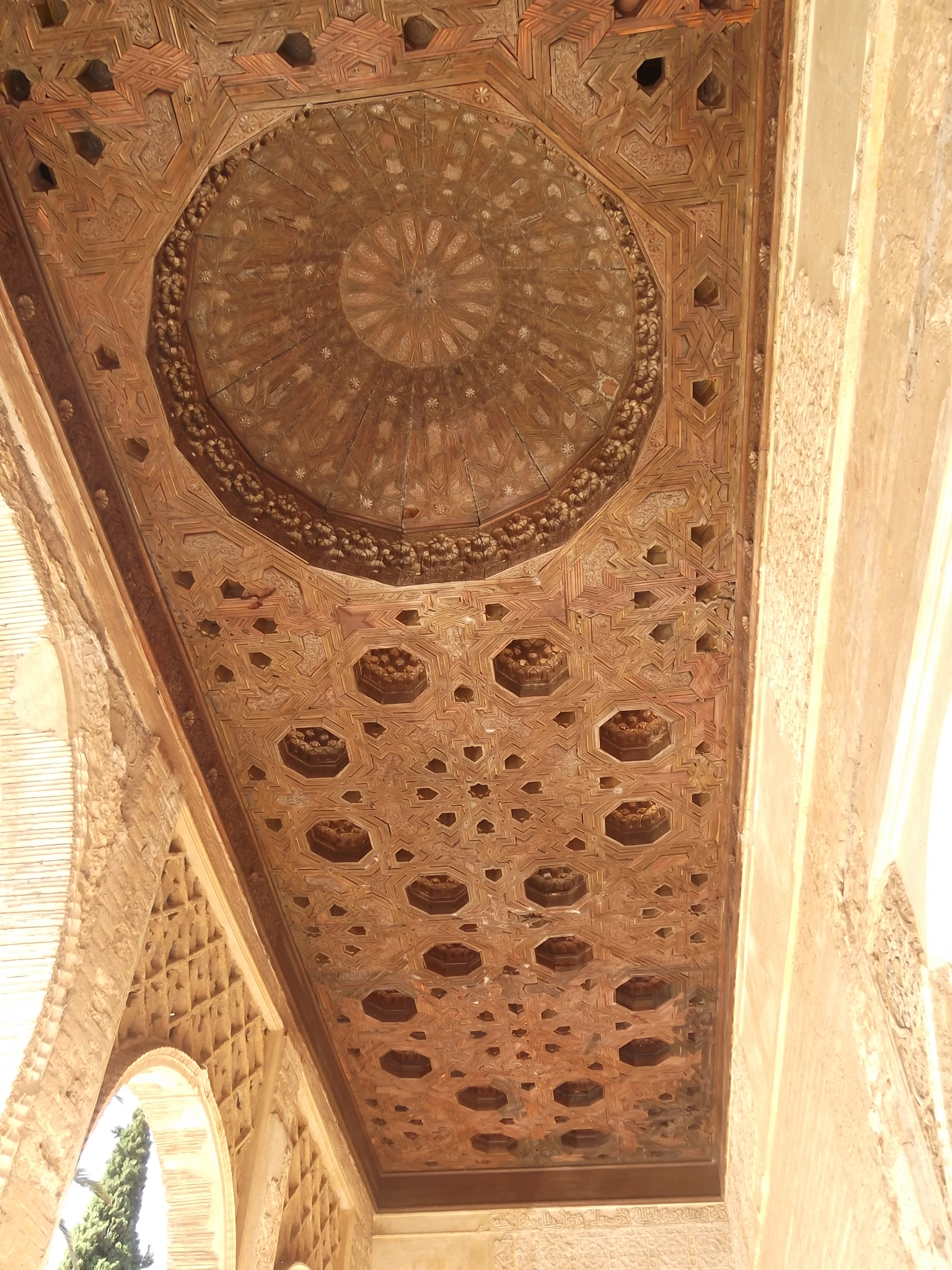
Wooden ceiling behind the portico

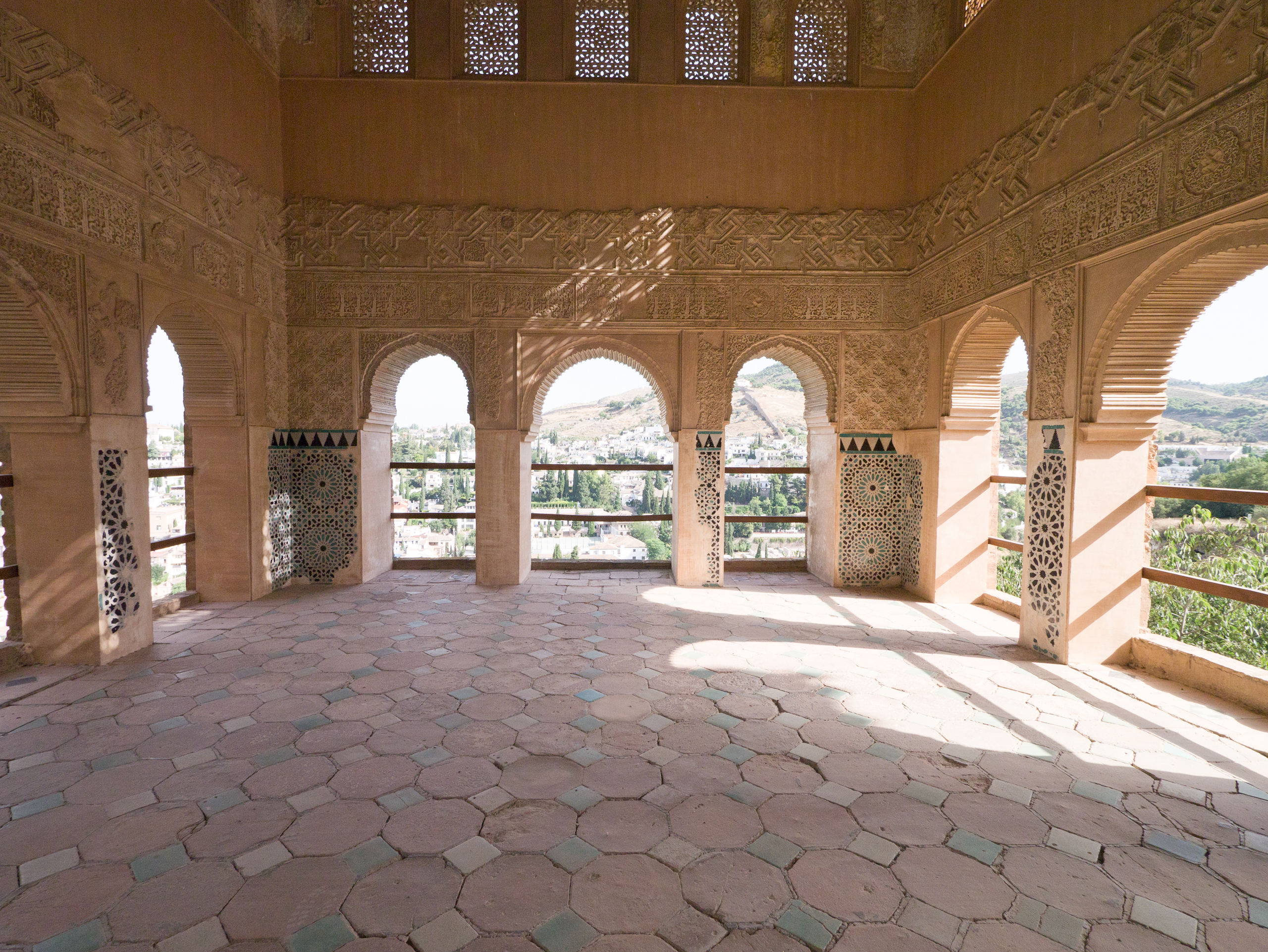
Interior of the mirador chamber, overlooking the city below; remains of original decoration can be seen

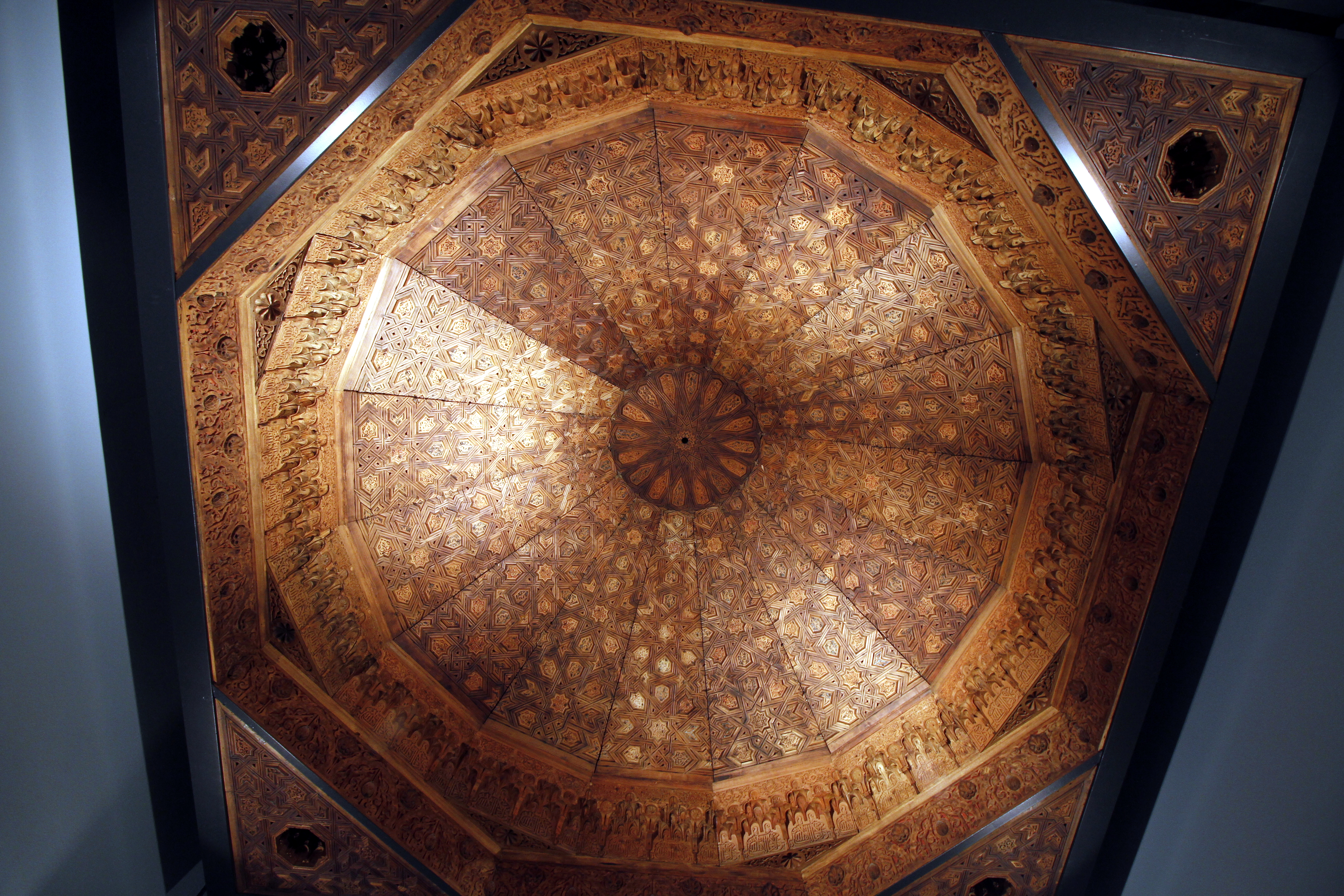
Wooden ceiling from the Torre de las Damas, today kept at the Museum of Islamic Art, Berlin

=== The oratory (prayer room) ===
On the right (east) side of the main tower is a small elevated pavilion structure, entered via a staircase on its northwest side. The small room inside it served as a private mosque or prayer room, as evidenced by its mihrab. The structure is also referred to by its Spanish designation, the oratorio or 'oratory'. The oratory has a rectangular layout measuring 4.16 meters long and 3 meters wide. It is similar in conception to the small oratory attached to the Mexuar. Like the latter, it also enjoyed great views through double-arched windows, a feature which was unique to this type of prayer space in the Alhambra. The room, its mihrab, and the exterior of its southwestern window are richly decorated with carved stucco in the Nasrid-era tradition, with arabesque motifs and various Arabic inscriptions with religious themes and references to God (Allah). The alcove inside the mihrab is covered by a muqarnas cupola. The room is covered by a Nasrid-era timber frame ceiling, constructed independently from the roof above it, which features interlacing eight-pointed star motifs. On the oratory's southeast side is an adjacent and contiguous structure known today as the House of Astasio de Bracamonte, after the squire of the Count of Tendilla (the governor of the Alhambra after 1492). The house has a three-level layout and a separate entrance on its southwestern side. It was built before the oratory, although its highest floor was added later during the 16th century. Both structures were built on top of an older fortification tower that formed a part of the Alhambra's outer defensive wall.

The oratory contains an inscription with the name of Yusuf I (ruled 1333–1354), indicating that it was finished or decorated by this ruler. As a result, the oratory's construction has been widely attributed to Yusuf I. Art historian Marianne Barrucand states that the structure itself was likely built earlier by Muhammad III, like the rest of the Partal. Recent dendrochonological analyses, published in 2014, indicate that several of the original timber pieces used to construct the oratory's ceiling were cut in the winter of 1332–1333. This dating suggests that Yusuf I was only responsible for completing the oratory's construction, while the construction was initiated instead by one of his predecessors, most likely Isma’il I (r. 1314–1325). In modern times, the oratory was restored in 1846 by Rafael Contreras and in 1930 by Leopoldo Torres Balbás. The most recent restoration occurred between 2013 and 2017 and focused on the restoration of its wooden ceiling. The restoration uncovered, among other things, a previously obscured Arabic inscription frieze painted along the upper boards around the base of the ceiling, containing part of a surah from the Qur'an.

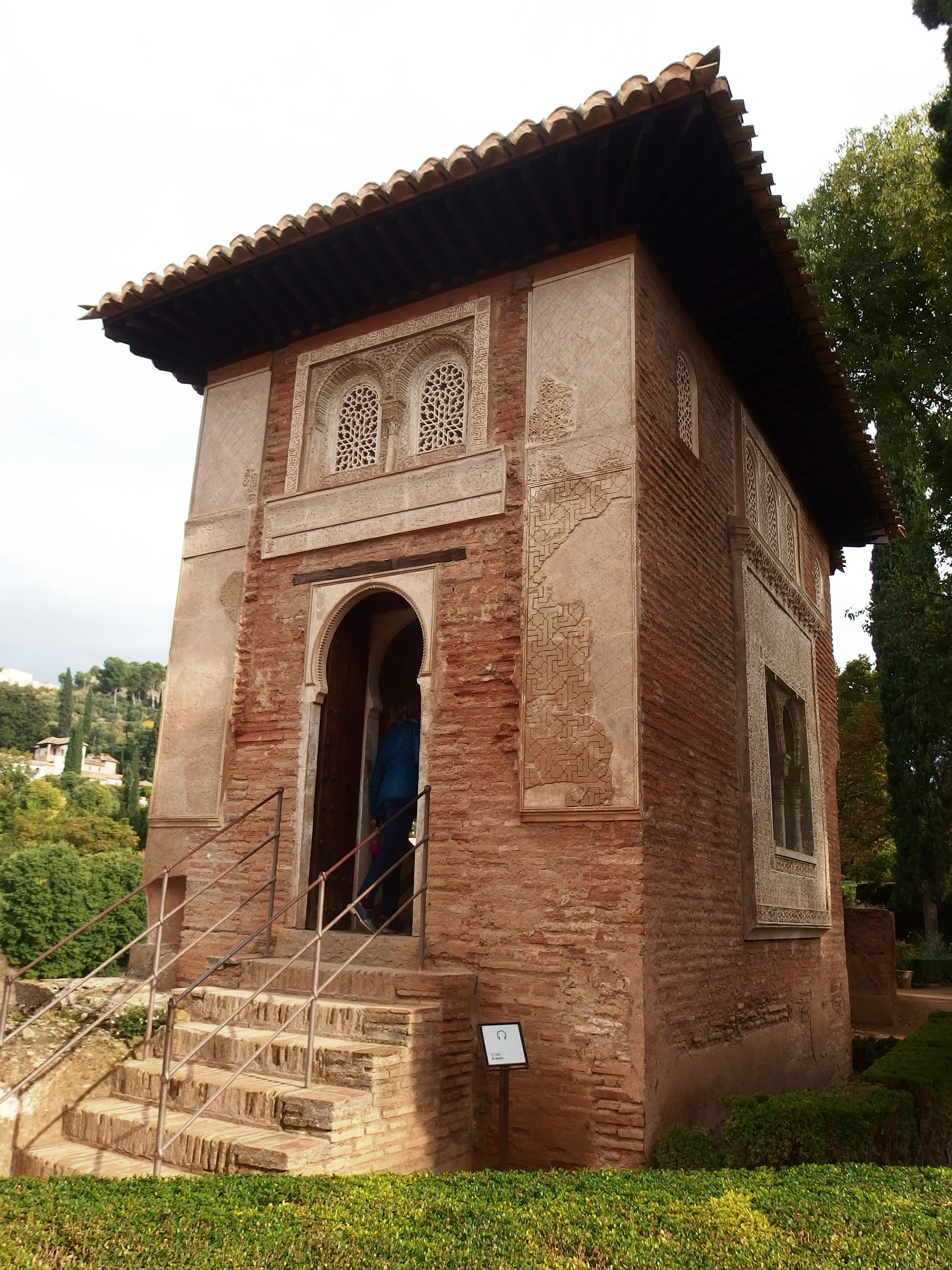
Entrance to the oratory

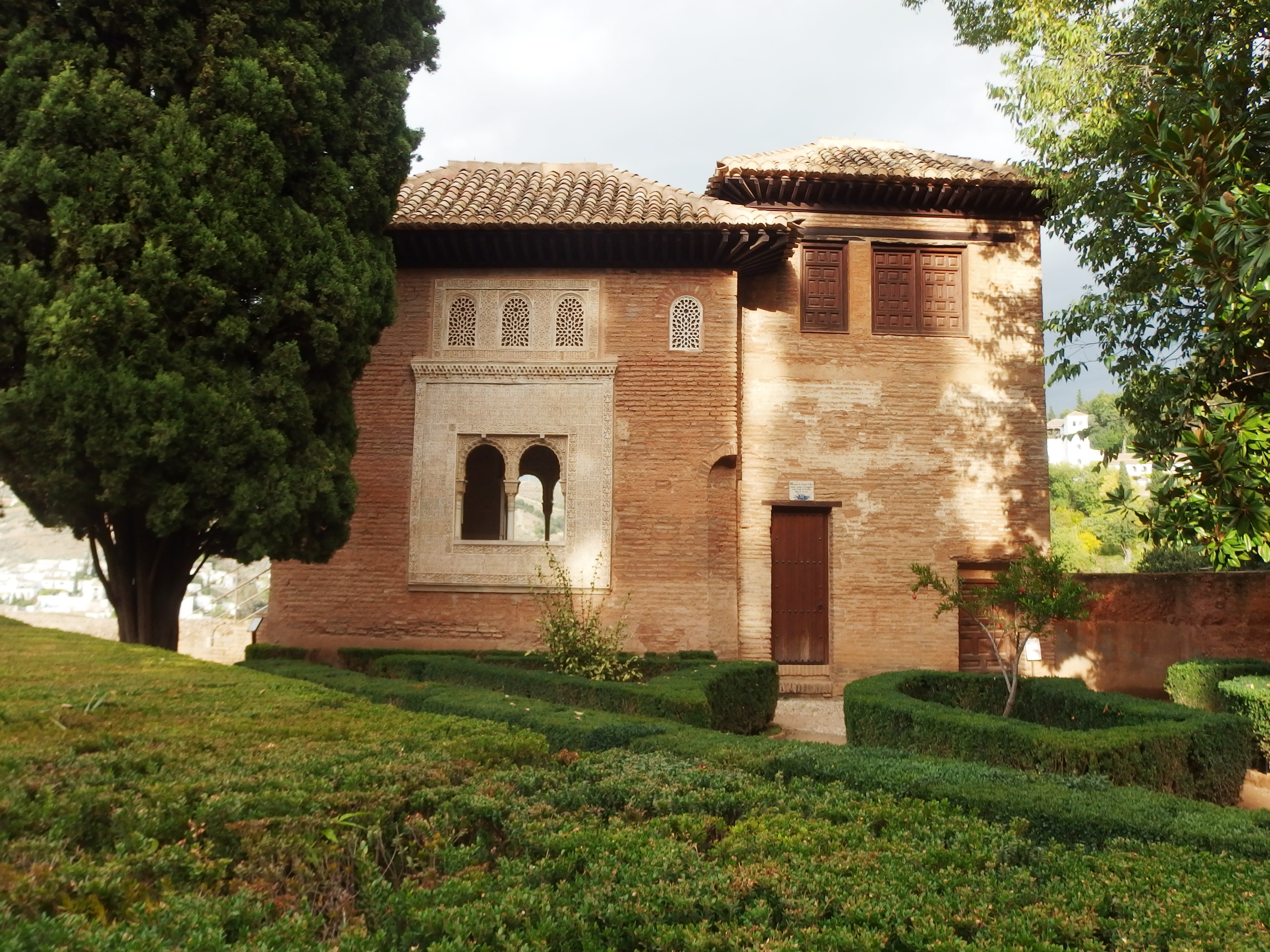
Side view of the structure

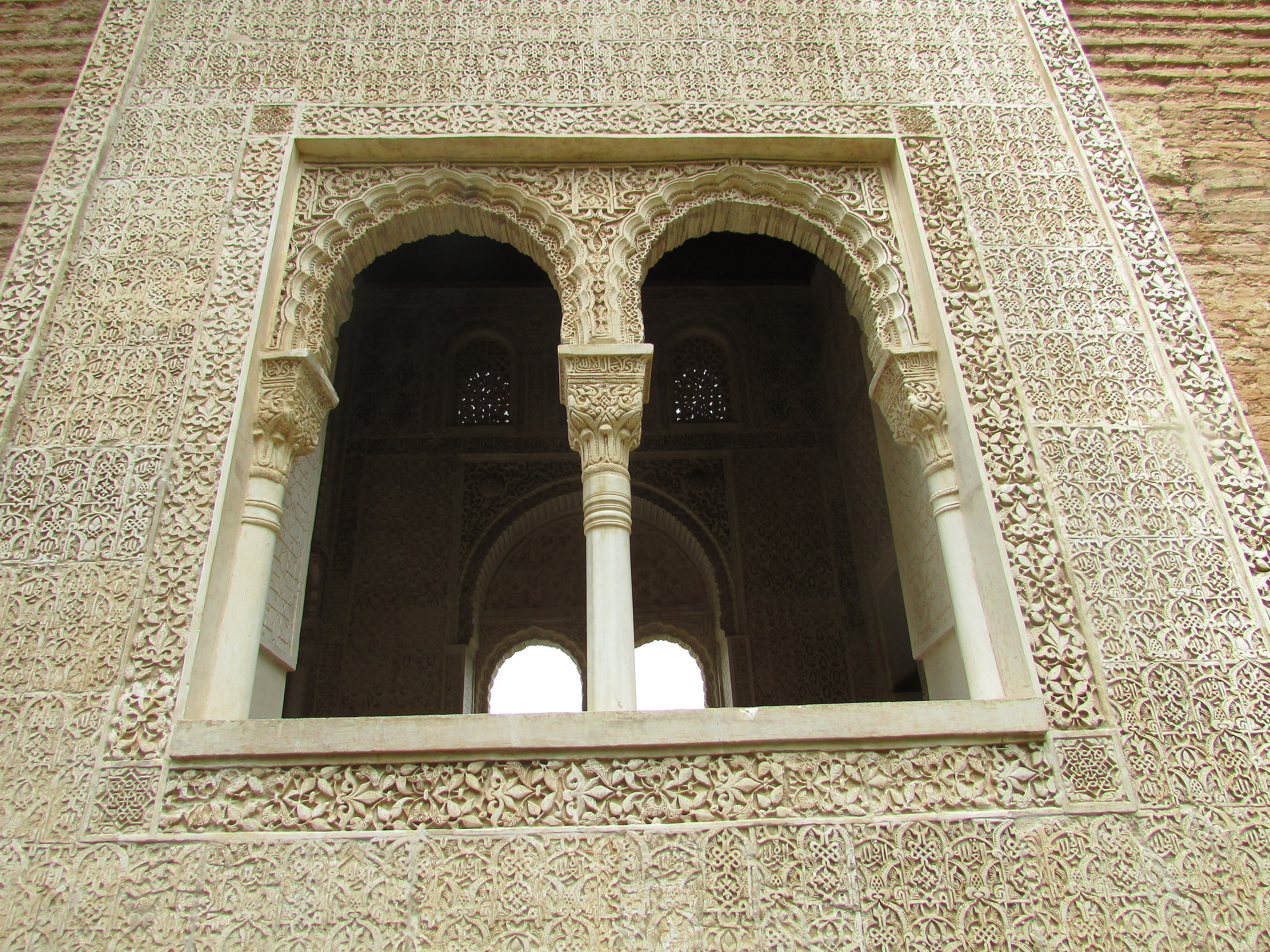
Decoration around the southwestern window

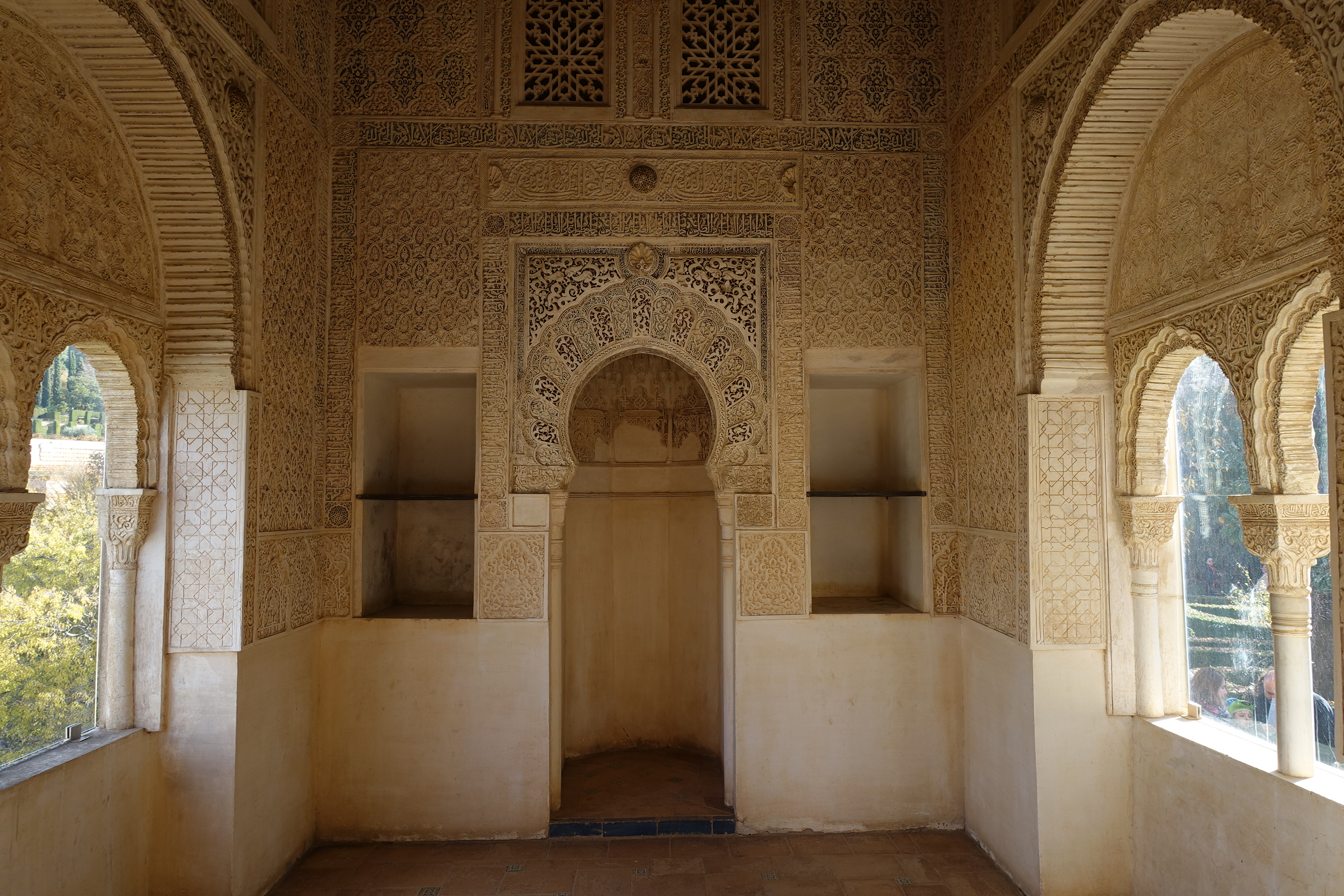
Interior, with the mihrab

=== Nasrid houses ===
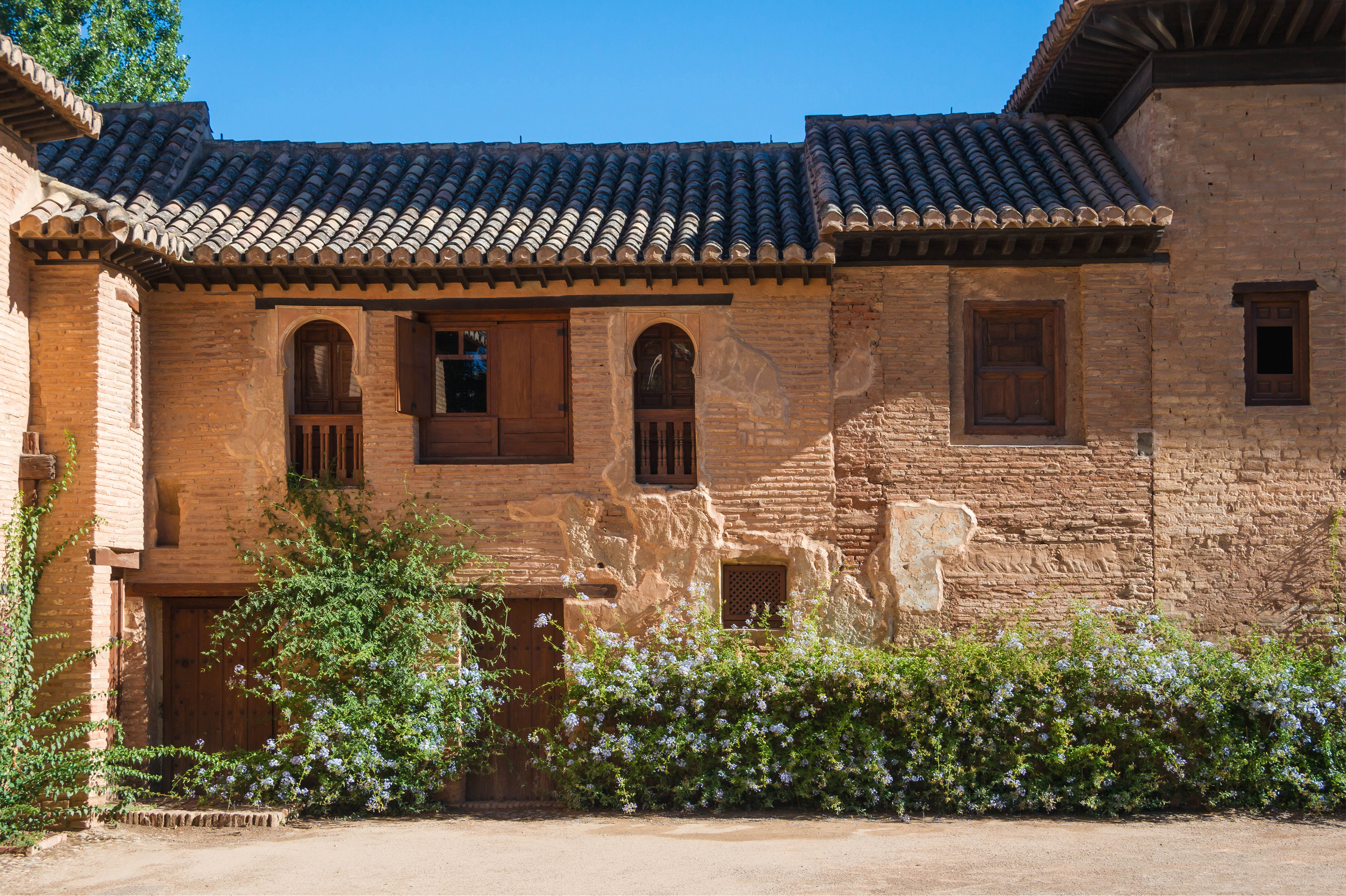
Exterior view of some of the houses

On the left (west) side of the tower are four Nasrid-period houses from the 14th century, which did not have their own internal courtyards. They are known today as the González Pareja House, the Villoslada house, the House of the Balconies, and the House of the Paintings. Although less impressive in design, they still contain some carved stucco decoration and are especially notable for the remnants of painted decoration, which may be the only surviving painted decoration executed by Nasrid artists. (The painted ceilings in the Hall of Kings in the Palace of the Lions, by contrast, may have been made by Christian artisans.) The mural paintings were discovered in 1907. Among other things, they depict rows of horsemen as well as tents with musicians, servants, and women of the Nasrid court.

=== Partal Gardens ===
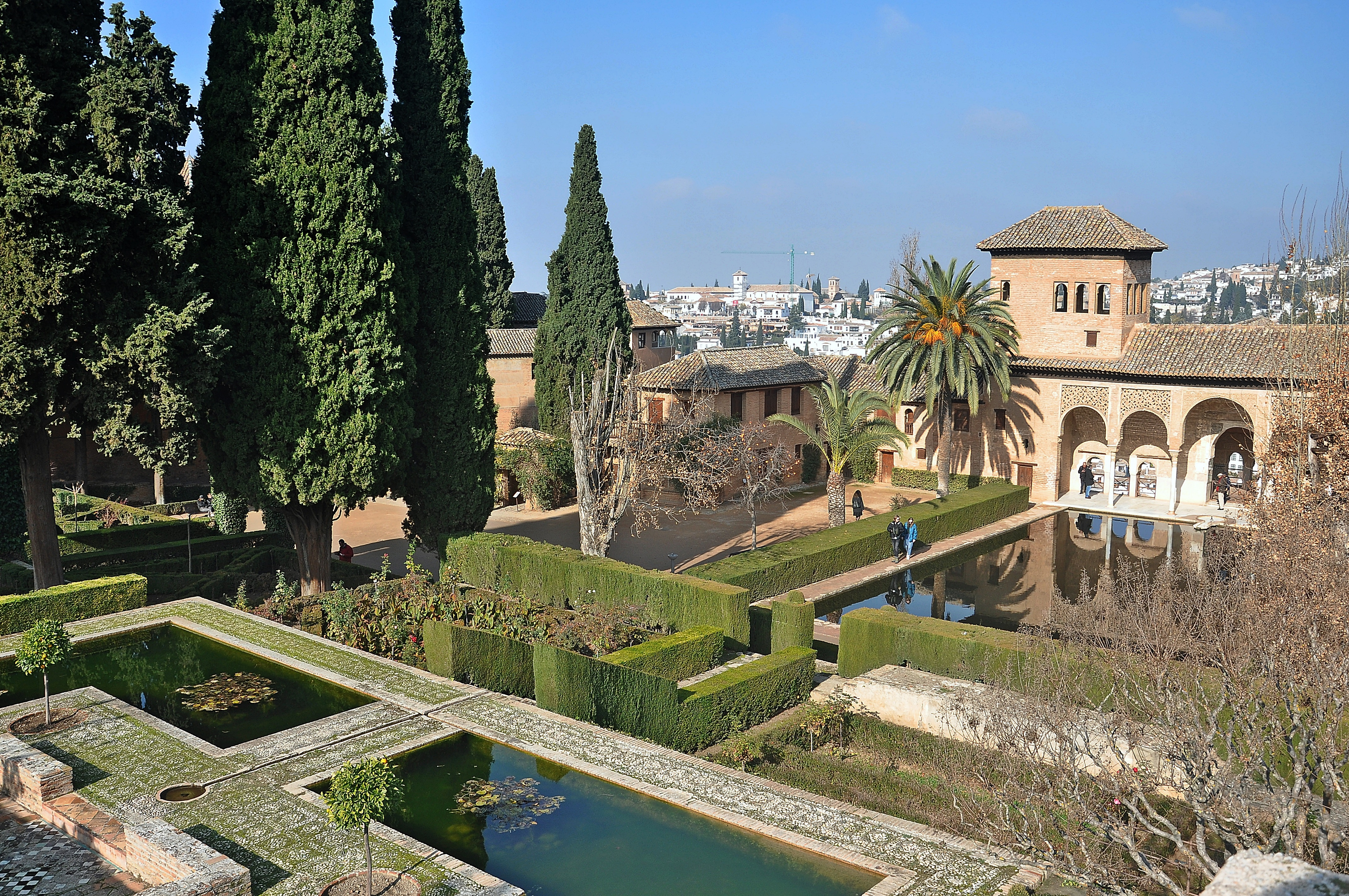
View of the terraced Partal Gardens

The extensive Partal Gardens (Jardines del Partal) stretch over the area to the south of the Partal Palace and its pool. They date from the time of Gómez-Moreno (1910s-1920s) and from landscaping carried out in the 1930s. They have little relation with any original Nasrid-period elements, but the landscaping allowed for further archeological investigations and replaced what was at that time an unkempt area. Among the gardens are the remains of the foundations of other houses and urban structures. One of these remains, located on the upper terrace of the gardens, belongs to a former palace known as the Palacio del Partal Alto.
