= Palacio del Partal Alto =

Former palace inside the Alhambra of Granada, Spain

Coordinates: 37°10′36″N 3°35′17.5″W

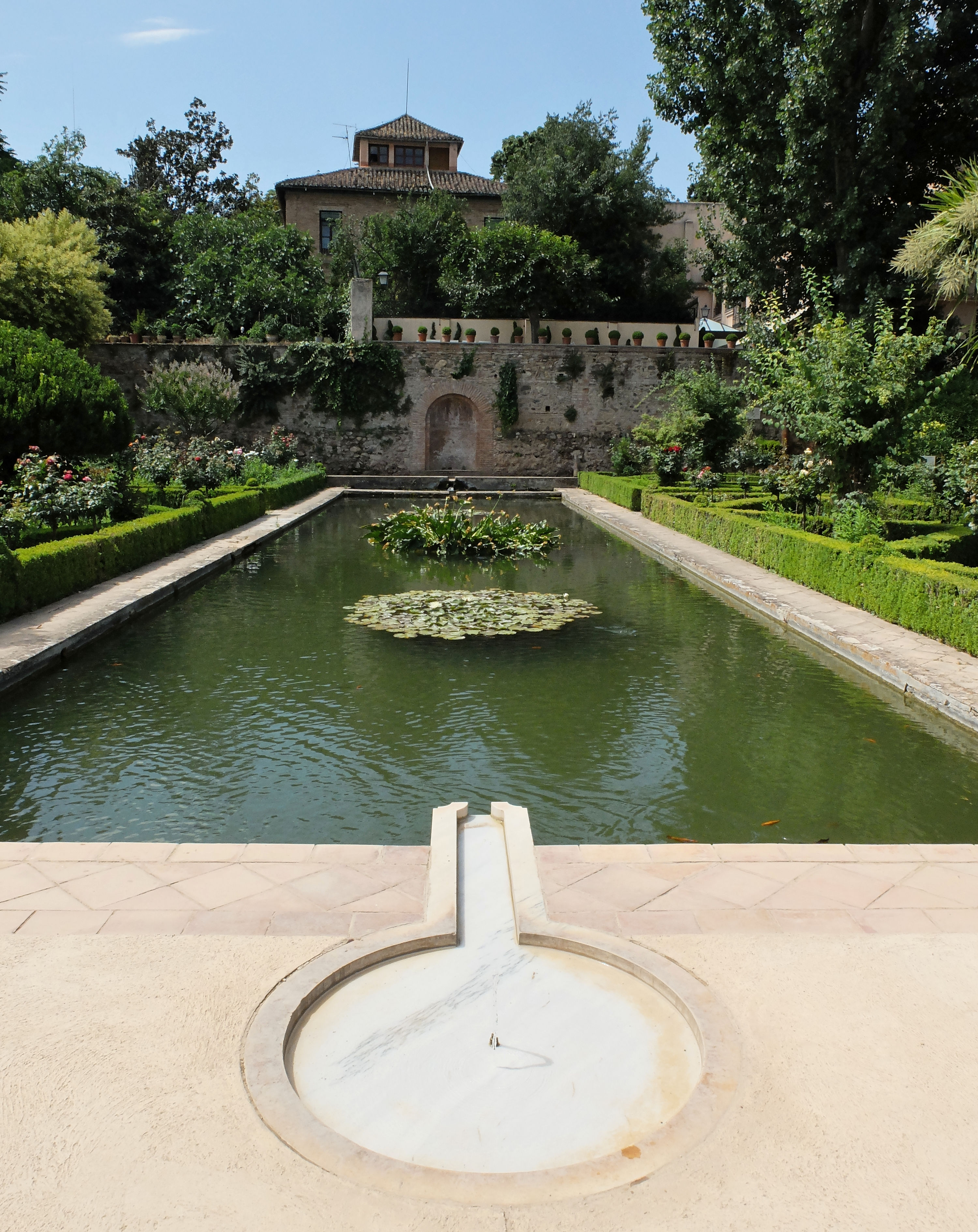
Remains of the Palacio del Partal Alto today, integrated into the Partal Gardens. This pool was once the center of the palace's main courtyard.

The Palacio del Partal Alto ("Upper Partal Palace" in Spanish), also known as the Palacio de Yusuf III ("Palace of Yusuf III") or the Palacio del Conde del Tendilla ("Palace of the Count of Tendilla"), is a former palace in the Alhambra, the historic citadel of Granada, Spain. It is the oldest palace in the Alhambra for which any remains have been found. It was built in the reign of the Nasrid ruler Muhammad II. After the conquest of Granada in 1492 it became the residence of the Count of Tendilla, the governor of the Alhambra, until it was confiscated by Philip V in 1717 and subsequently demolished. After excavations in the 20th century, a part of the palace's foundations are visible today in the Partal Gardens.

== History ==
The palace's construction was traditionally attributed to Yusuf III (r. 1408–1417) – hence one of its names – but more current scholarship attributes its creation to the reign of Muhammad II (r. 1273–1302), with Yusuf III having most likely renovated it during his reign. The palace may correspond to what was called the Dār al-Kubrā (Arabic: دار الكبرى, lit. 'Great House'), the official palace of the sultan. After the end of the Reconquista and the departure of the Nasrids in 1492, the palace became the official residence of the mayor (alcaide) of the Alhambra, the Count of Tendilla (later also Marquis of Mondéjar), the first of whom was Iñigo López de Mondoza y Quiñones (d. 1515). Hieronymus Münzer, a European traveler who visited the city in the 1490s shortly after the conquest, described the palace as being the most impressive of all the palaces in the Alhambra.

The Tendilla-Mondéjar family remained governors until 1717, when Philip V dismissed José de Mendoza Ibáñez de Segovia (d. 1734), the Marquis of Mondéjar (heir to the Count of Tendilla), from this position and suppressed the office of the mayor. This was done as punishment for Marquis siding against the Bourbons during the War of the Spanish Succession. Philip confiscated the Marquis's properties in the Alhambra, including the palace. As the palace was in a poor state of repair and he could no longer use it, the Marquis demolished it in 1718 or between 1734 and 1735. Some of the palace's pieces were sold off afterward and are found in private collections today. The remains of the palace were excavated in 1924 by Leopoldo Torres Balbás. The site was integrated into a zone of landscaped gardens, the Partal Gardens, dating to the time of Gómez-Moreno (1910s-1920s) and to other landscaping carried out in the 1930s. The remains of the palace underwent a more thorough archeological investigation by Antonio Almagro Gorbea and Antonio Orihuela Uzal between 2001 and 2004. About one third of the original palace, still buried under the higher ground to the south, remains undocumented.

== Description ==
The form of the palace follows the same model as the later Comares and Partal palaces. It consisted of a structure centered on a long rectangular courtyard with a long water basin along its middle. The basin was large enough to act as a reflective pool and it highlighted the main central axis of the building. Two smaller pools were located along at both ends of the courtyard's short axis. At the north end of the building's main axis was a tower structure or a domed hall, which may have had windows offering views onto the gardens to the north, much like the miradors in other Nasrid palaces. The hall was probably preceded by a portico, and a similar structure may have existed at the south end of the courtyard. The hall was flanked by two side small chambers and, beyond these, two more square chambers that may have also been domed. By comparing this layout with the arrangement of chambers in the Alhambra's Mexuar, scholar Felix Arnold has theorized that the western chamber was used as the sultan's dressing room while the eastern chamber served as a treasury. He also notes the similarity between this palace and the Cuarto Real palace and the Alcázar Genil in Granada, which both date from around the same time or earlier. He suggests that the Palacio del Partal Alto demonstrates the development of early Nasrid palaces which began integrating the features of rural villas into the design of urban palaces.

The palace was surrounded on either side by other structures that were annexed to it. On its east side of the palace courtyard was a hammam (bathhouse) whose layout was similar to that of other hammams in the Alhambra. The remains of its hypocaust system and of a fountain in its former hot room are visible today. The original entrance to the palace was also found on this side, at the northeast corner of the complex. The recesses of the doorway are still visible. From the doorway, a short corridor led to an almost square-shaped courtyard, next to which may have been a stable so that guests could dismount and leave their horses. On the west side of the main courtyard are the remains of two living quarters or houses. These residences were probably modified in the post-Reconquista period. Both contain a central water basin and the remains of latrines. The northern house, which was on a lower terrace, has a room to the south of the water basin which contains two alhamíes: alcoves with a bench or raised floor. This house also contains a room with a polygonal floor fountain and glazed ceramic decoration. This room may have served as an entrance courtyard. The two houses were connected to the main palace courtyard through a set of stairs in the middle. Further west from the palace, on the other side of a street, was the Rawda, the dynastic mausoleum of the Nasrids.

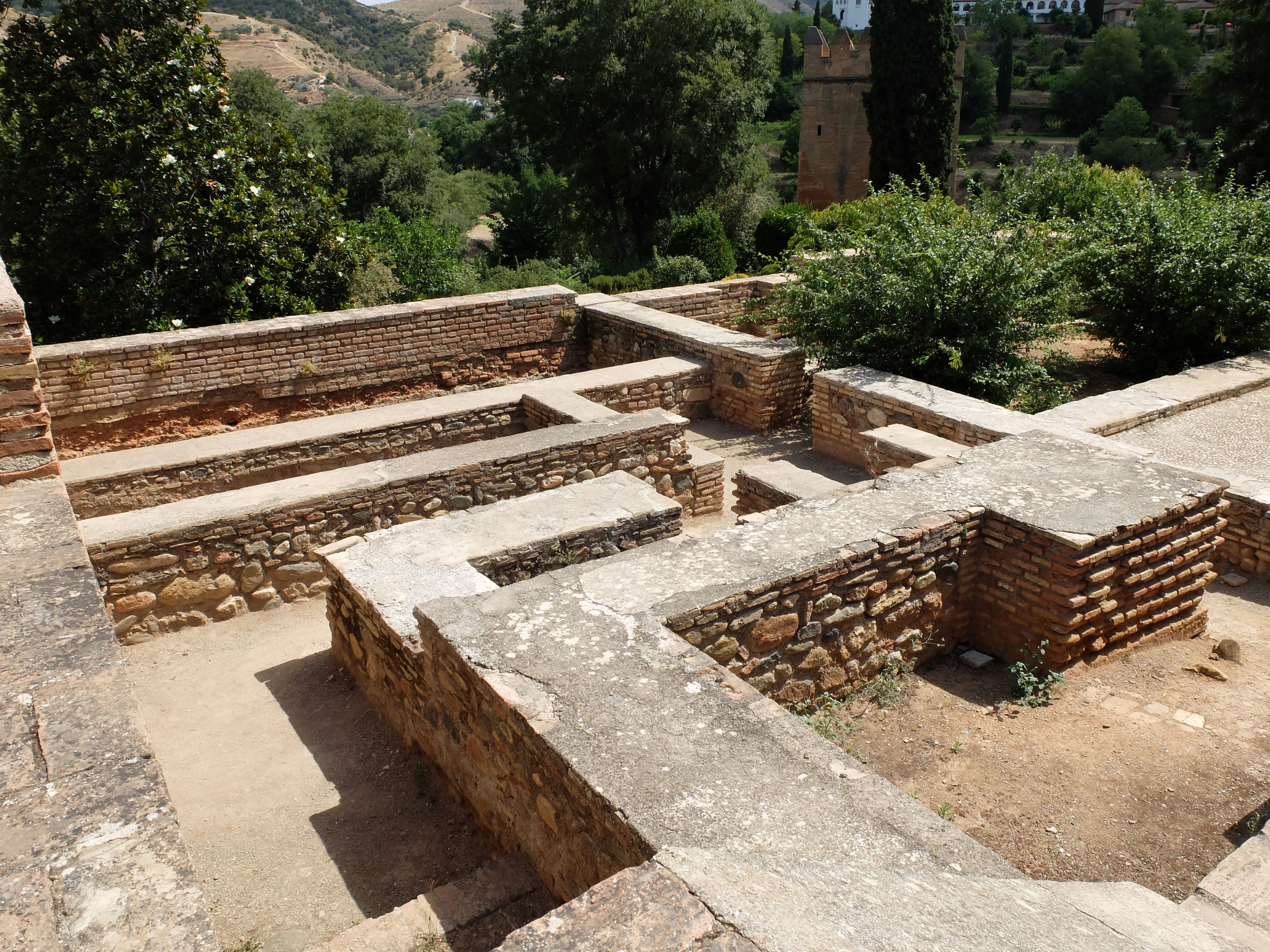
Remains of the hammam (bathhouse) on the east side of the palace

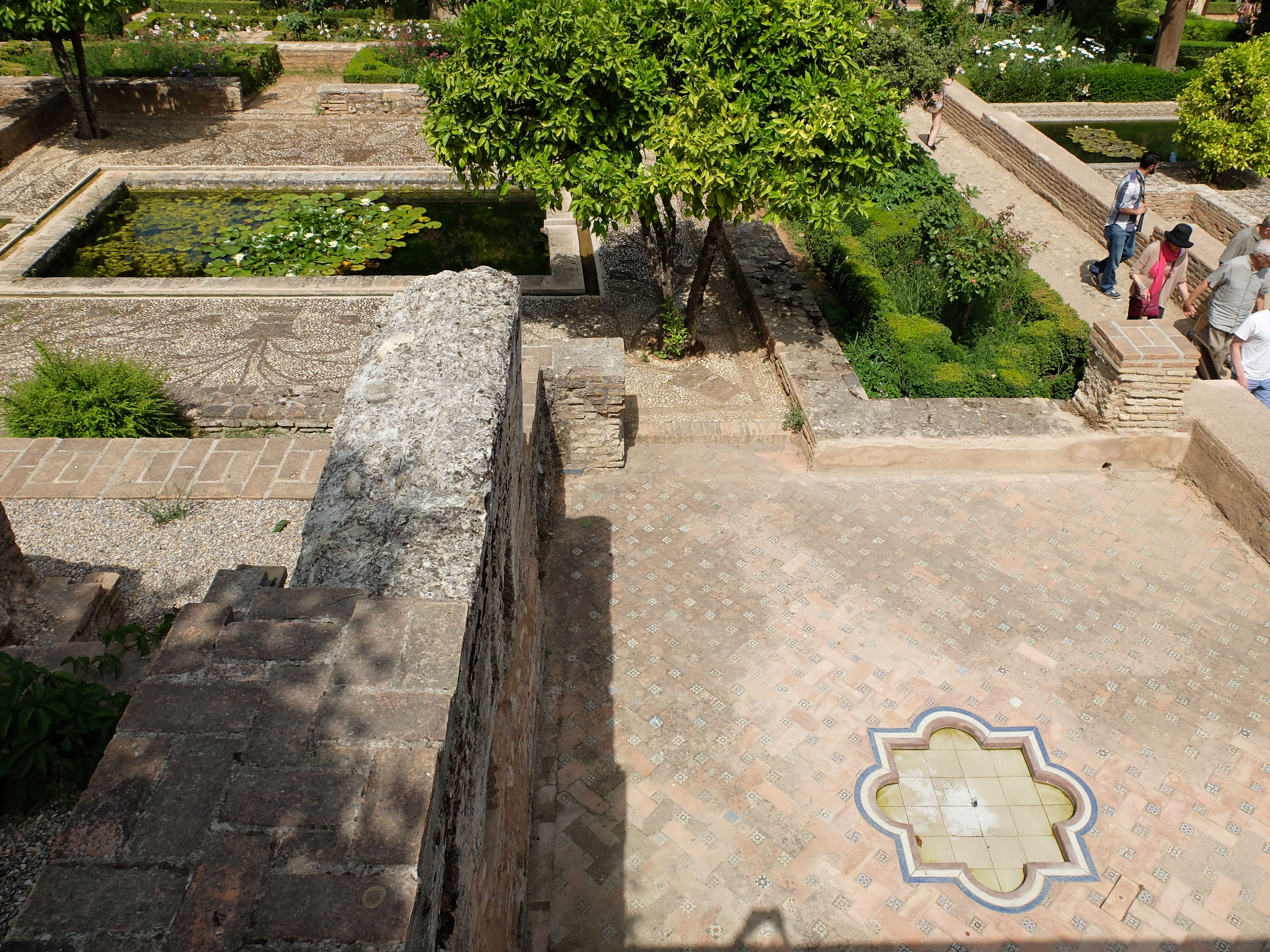
Remains of the lower house on the west side of the palace

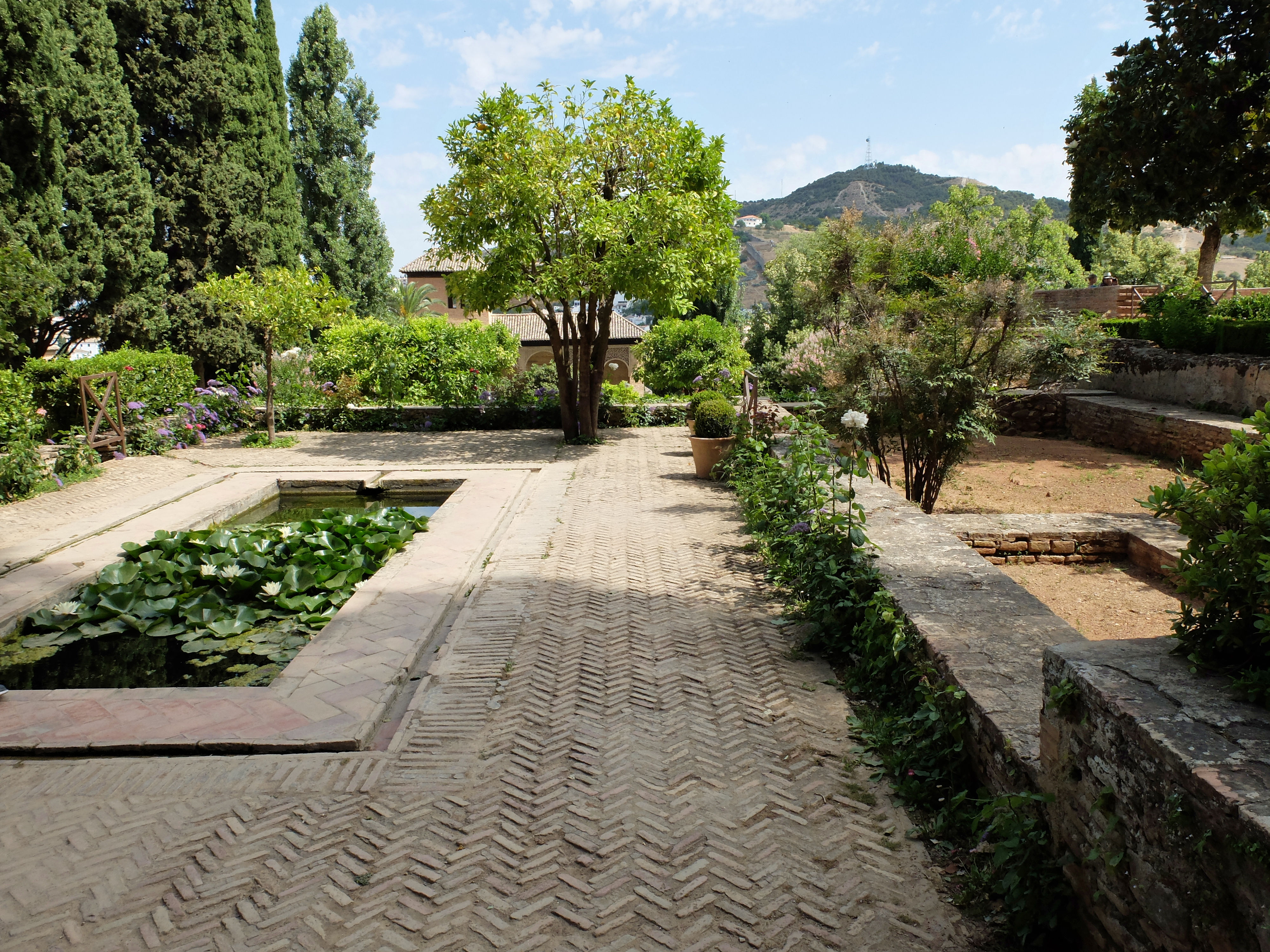
Remains of the upper house on the west side of the palace
