= Ibn al-Jayyab =

Moorish writer (1274–1349 AD/673–749 AH)

- ابو الحسن علي بن محمد بن سليمان بن علي بن سليمان بن حسن الأنصاري الغرناطي
- Born: Abū al-Ḥasan ‘Alī b. Muḥammad b. Suleiman b. ‘Alī b. Suleiman b. Ḥassān al-Anṣārī al-Gharnāṭī; 1274; Granada, Emirate of Granada
- Died: 1349 (aged 74–75); Granada, Emirate of Granada
- Occupations: Writer, Poet, Minister
- Writing career
- Notable work: Poems etched onto the walls of the Alhambra

Ibn al-Jayyāb al-Gharnāṭī (ابن الجياب الغرناطي); Abū al-Ḥasan ‘Alī b. Muḥammad b. Suleiman b. ‘Alī b. Suleiman b. Ḥassān al-Anṣārī al-Gharnāṭī (ابو الحسن علي بن محمد بن سليمان بن علي بن سليمان بن حسن الأنصاري الغرناطي); Spanish var., Ibn al-Ŷayyab, (1274–1349 AD/673–749 AH); was an Andalusian writer, poet and minister from the Nasrid court of the Emirate of Granada in what is now Spain.

He was of Arab heritage descending from the Ansar tribe and was born in Granada, where he grew up and became involved with a group of distinguished scholars in that city. He died of the Black Death plague in Granada.

His substantial legacy of poetry and prose was posthumously collated by his many students, among whom was Ibn al-Khaṭīb, who succeeded him as vizier. He wrote his qasidas (poems) in a neo-classical style, and some still decorate the walls of the summer palace of the Nasrid sultans, the Alhambra.

== Poetry and the Alhambra ==
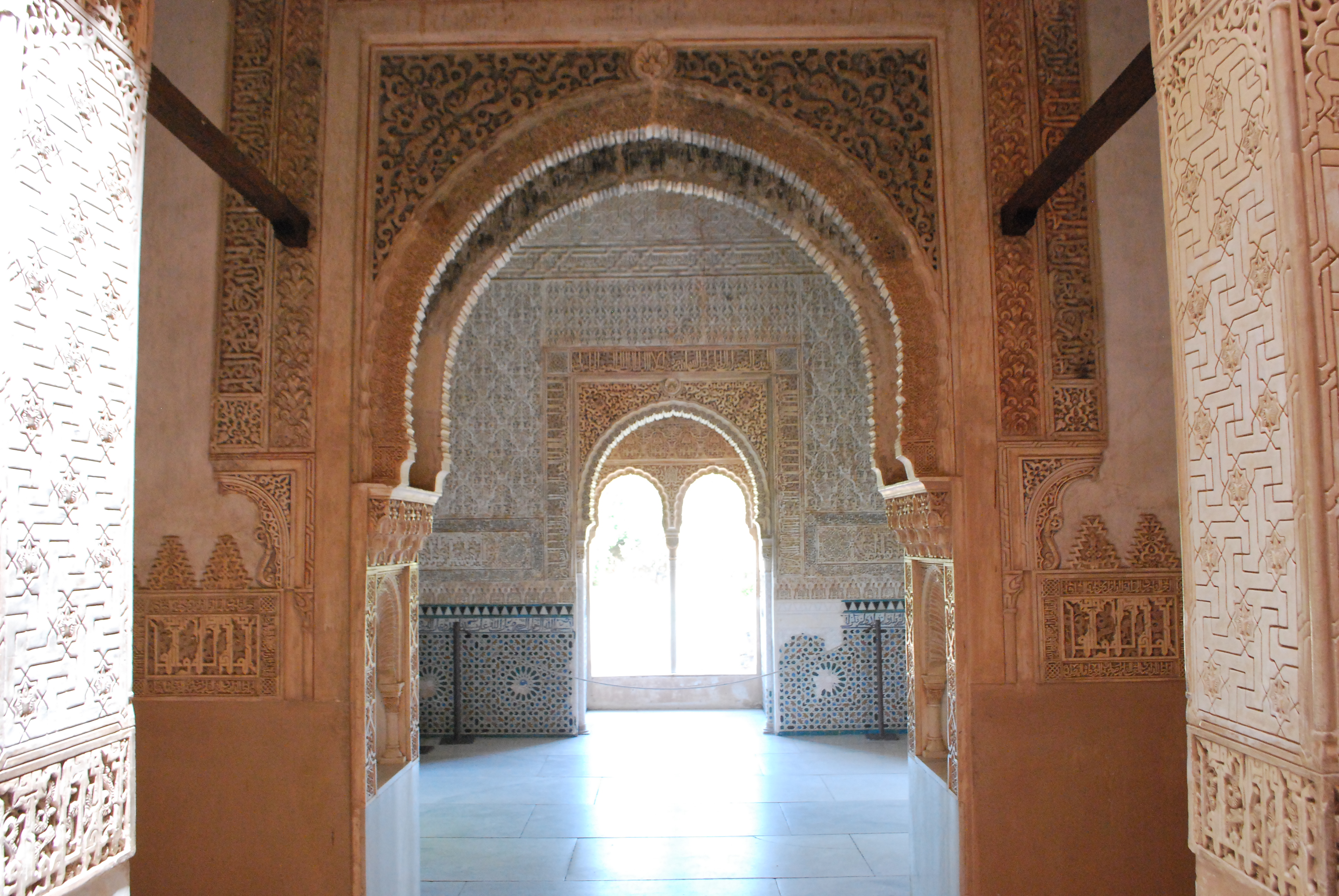
The Tower of the Captive. On one of the central niches there are carved excerpts from Ibn-al Jayyab's poetry such as ‘Praise be to God for the favours that one after the other He grants'

Ibn al-Jayyab was one of three poets including Ibn al-Khatib, and Ibn Zamrak who had their poems etched onto the walls of the Alhambra, largely built in the 13th and 14th centuries. Ibn al-Jayyab's poems are etched into multiple areas of Alhambra including the Tower of the Captive (also known as the Qalahurra of Yusuf I), the Hall of Ambassadors, and the entrance of the Sala de la Barca. He created between ten and twelve mural poems.

In addition all of the poems in the Qalahurra are his, of which there are four. In these poems Ibn al-Jayyab uses badī poetry techniques as a way to help his contemporary Nasrid readers understand his poetry. Like many of the other poems in the Alhambra Ibn al-Jayyab's works often refer to the architecture on which they are written, in some of these poems he writes from the point of view of the building itself creating the idea that the walls themselves are speaking and not the author of the poem. Below is one of his poems from the Tower of the Captive:

This piece of art has come to decorate the Alhambra;
which is the home of the peaceful and of the warriors;
Calahorra that contains a palace.
Say that it is at the same time a fortress and a mansion for joy!
It is a palace in which magnificence is shared
among its ceiling, its floor and its four walls;
on the stuccowork and on the glazed tiles there are wonders,
but the carved wooden ceilings are even more extraordinary;
these were all united and their union gave birth to the most perfect
construction in the place where the highest mansion already stood;
they seem poetic images, paronomasias and transpositions,
the decorative branches and inlays.
Yusuf's visage appears before us as a sign
that is where all the perfections have met.
It is from the glorious tribe of Jazray, whose works in favour of the religion
are like dawn, when its light appears in the horizon.

Ibn al-Jayyab also composed a poem for a recently created Madrasa or university a few months before his death, though this poem was ultimately not inscribed there when the Madrasa was inaugurated.

Oh student of science, its open door is open.
Enter and witness its radiance; the morning sun has appeared.
Thank your benefactor on entering and leaving.
For, God has brought near what was far off in your aiming.
The capital of Islam has founded a madrasa
in which the path of good guidance and of science has become clear.
The works and doings of our Sovereign Yusuf
decorated its pages, tipped its scale.

== Nasrid court ==
Ibn al-Jayyab was a vizier of the Nasrid sultan Yusuf I. In addition he was the chief secretary of the sultan as well. It is recorded that when the Yusuf was going to create a substitute to himself he had Ibn al-Jayyab, in his capacity of chief secretary, draft the legal paper to have this done. It is also said that at times he would go against the sultan's decisions if he believed it to be the correct choice.

== Relationship with Ibn al-Khatib ==
Ibn al-Khatib first came to Ibn al-Jayyab's attention when he was a young boy and his father was a part of the Nasrid court of Granada. Ibn al-Jayyab personally taught the young boy poetry which he would continue to write throughout his life. Ibn al-Jayyab imparted his advice multiple times to the young man including subjects like court politics 'When Ibn al-Jayyab talked about how firmly he behaved with the sultan who had appointed him, even though he was very intimidating and authoritarian, he mentioned facts that showed his decisiveness. One of these cases was the following: The sultan ordered the release of a prisoner who the judge had imprisoned. But the Qadi, in the presence of the sultan, ordered the jailer to keep him in prison and threatened him if he freed him.'

Ibn al-Jayyab's fatal contraction of the Black Death would have a profound effect on Ibn al-Khatib and cause him to study medicine and write a treatise on the plague. Upon his death his protégé would succeed him as the Vizier of both civil and military affairs for the Nasrid Sultanate. Ibn al-Khatib's writings show great fondness and admiration for his mentor, and would likely go on to influence his relationship with his own pupil Ibn al-Zamrak. His works would eventually go on to adorn the walls of the Alhambra alongside his mentor's.
