= Alhambra =

Palace and fortress complex in Granada, Spain

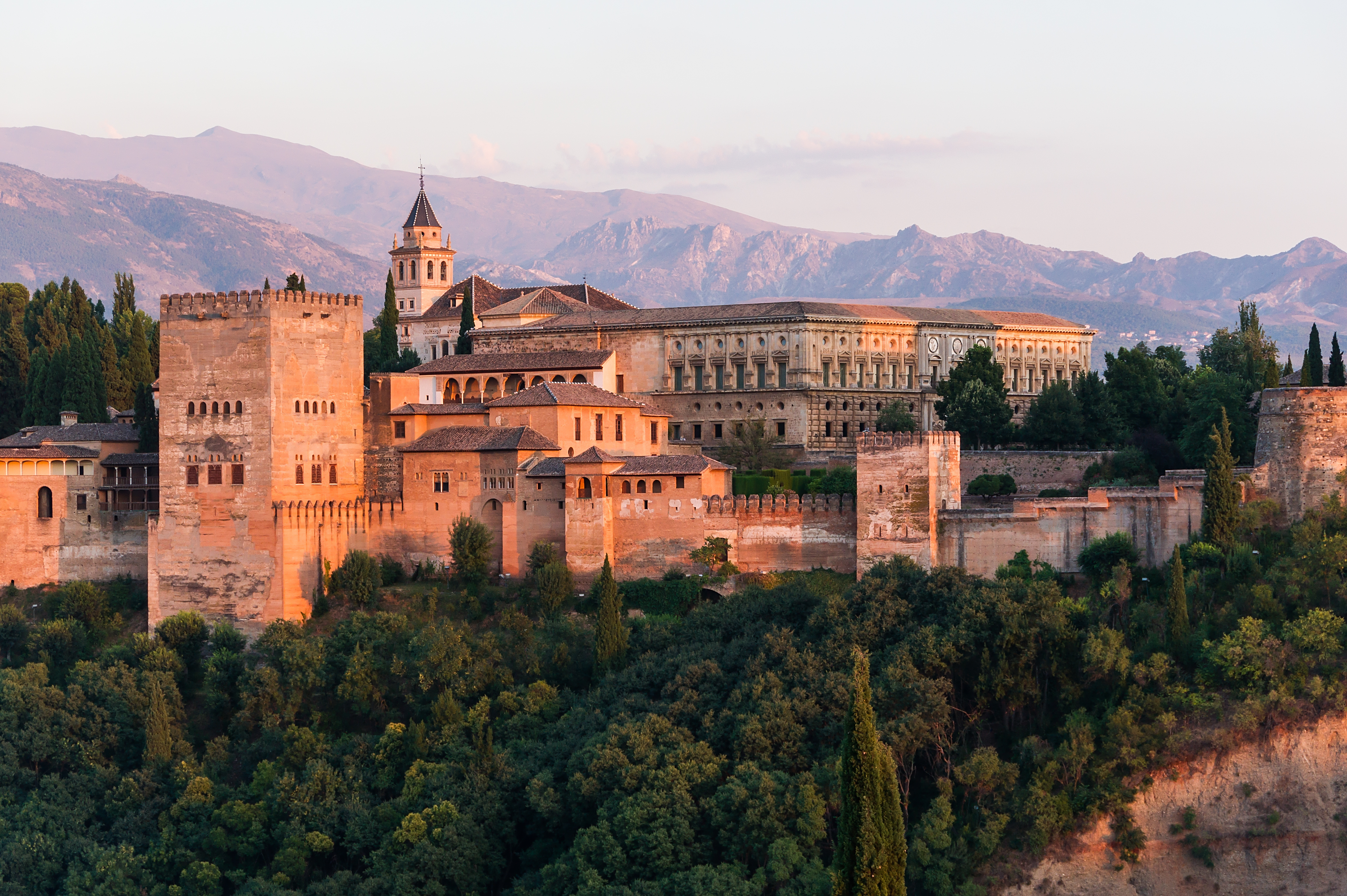
- Interactive map of Alhambra
- 37°10′39″N 03°35′24″W
- Location: Granada, Spain

Site notes
- Website: Patronato de la Alhambra

UNESCO World Heritage Site
- Criteria: Cultural: i, iii, iv
- Designated: 1984 (8th session)
- Part of: Alhambra, Generalife and Albayzín, Granada
- Reference no.: 314-001
- Region: List of World Heritage Sites in Southern Europe

Spanish Cultural Heritage
- Type: Non-movable
- Criteria: Monument
- Designated: 10 February 1870
- Reference no.: RI-51-0000009

The Alhambra (/æl.ˈhæm.brə/, Spanish: [aˈlambɾa]; Arabic: الْحَمْرَاء, romanized: al-ḥamrāʼ) is a palace and fortress complex located in Granada, Spain. It is one of the most famous monuments of Islamic architecture and the only well-preserved palace from the medieval Islamic world. Additionally, the palace contains notable examples of Spanish Renaissance architecture.

The building of the complex was begun in 1238 CE by Muhammad I Ibn al-Ahmar, the first Nasrid ruler and founder of the Emirate of Granada, the last Muslim state of al-Andalus. It was built on Sabika hill, an outcrop of the Sierra Nevada which had been the site of earlier fortresses and of the 11th-century palace of Samuel ibn Naghrillah. Later Nasrid rulers continuously modified the site. The most significant construction campaigns, which gave the royal palaces much of their defining character, took place in the 14th century during the reigns of Yusuf I and Muhammad V. After the conclusion of the Christian Reconquista in 1492, the site became the Royal Court of Ferdinand and Isabella (where Christopher Columbus received royal endorsement for his expedition), and the palaces were partially altered. In 1526, Charles V commissioned a new Renaissance-style palace in direct juxtaposition with the Nasrid palaces. The Alhambra fell into disrepair over the following centuries, with its buildings occupied by squatters. The troops of Napoleon destroyed parts of it in 1812. After this, the Alhambra became an attraction for British, American, and other European Romantic travellers. The most influential of them was Washington Irving, whose Tales of the Alhambra (1832) brought international attention to the site. The Alhambra was one of the first Islamic monuments to become the object of modern scientific study and has been the subject of numerous restorations since the 19th century. It is now one of Spain's major tourist attractions and a UNESCO World Heritage Site.

During the Nasrid era, the Alhambra was a self-contained city separate from the rest of Granada below. It contained most of the amenities of a Muslim city such as a Friday mosque, hammams (public baths), roads, houses, artisan workshops, a tannery, and a sophisticated water supply system. As a royal city and citadel, it contained at least six major palaces, most of them located along the northern edge where they commanded views over the Albaicín quarter. The most famous and best-preserved are the Mexuar, the Comares Palace, the Palace of the Lions, and the Partal Palace, which form the main attraction to visitors today. The other palaces are known from historical sources and from modern excavations. At the Alhambra's western tip is the Alcazaba fortress. Multiple smaller towers and fortified gates are also located along the Alhambra's walls. Outside the Alhambra walls and located nearby to the east is the Generalife, a former Nasrid country estate and summer palace accompanied by historic orchards and modern landscaped gardens.

The architecture of the Nasrid palaces reflects the tradition of Moorish architecture developed over previous centuries. It is characterized by the use of the courtyard as a central space and basic unit around which other halls and rooms were organized. Courtyards typically had water features at their centre, such as a reflective pool or a fountain. Decoration was focused on the inside of the building and was executed primarily with tile mosaics on lower walls and carved stucco on the upper walls. Geometric patterns, vegetal motifs, and Arabic inscriptions were the main types of decorative motifs. Additionally, "stalactite"-like sculpting, known as muqarnas, was used for three-dimensional features like vaulted ceilings.

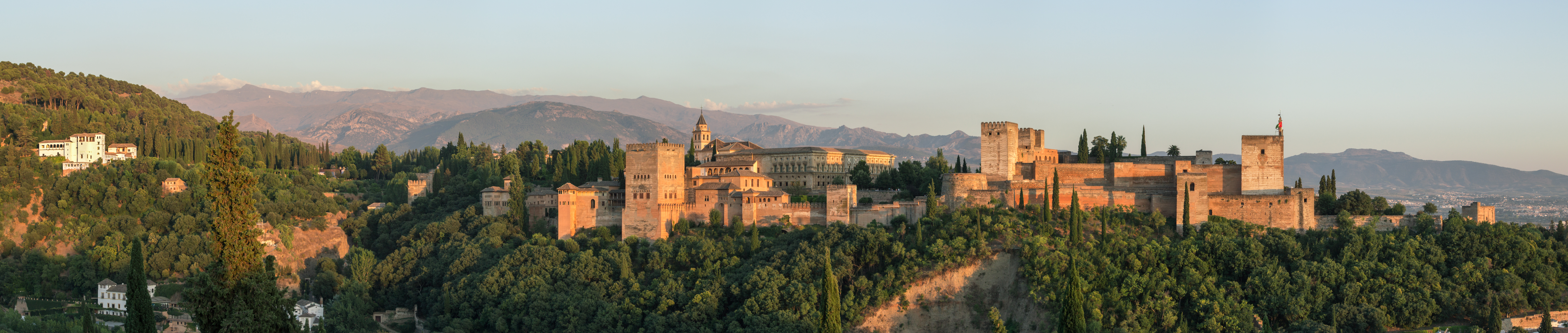
Panorama of the Alhambra from Mirador de San Nicolas (Albaicín). From left to right: Generalife, Veleta mountain, Nasrid Palaces, Palace of Charles V, and Alcazaba.

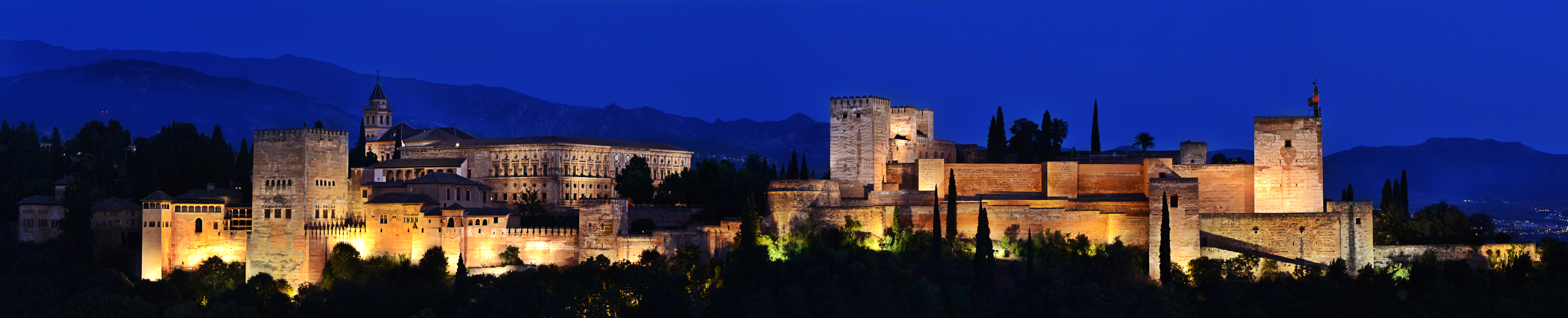
Night view of Alhambra from Mirador de San Nicolas

== Etymology ==
Alhambra derives from the Arabic الْحَمْرَاء (al-Ḥamrāʼ , pronounced [alħamˈraːʔ]), meaning lit. 'the red one' (f.), the complete form of which was الْقَلْعَةُ ٱلْحَمْرَاءُ al-Qalʻah al-Ḥamrāʼ "the red fortress (qal'a)". The "Al-" in "Alhambra" means "the" in Arabic, but this is ignored in general usage in both English and Spanish, where the name is normally given the definite article. The reference to the colour "red" in the name is due to the reddish colour of its walls, which were constructed of rammed earth. The colour comes from the iron oxide in the local clay used for this type of construction.

Most of the names used today for specific structures and locations within the Alhambra are imaginative names coined after the mediaeval period, often in the 19th century. The original Arabic names of the Nasrid-era buildings are not known, although some scholars have proposed connections between certain buildings and some of the names mentioned in historical sources.

== History ==
=== Origins and early history ===
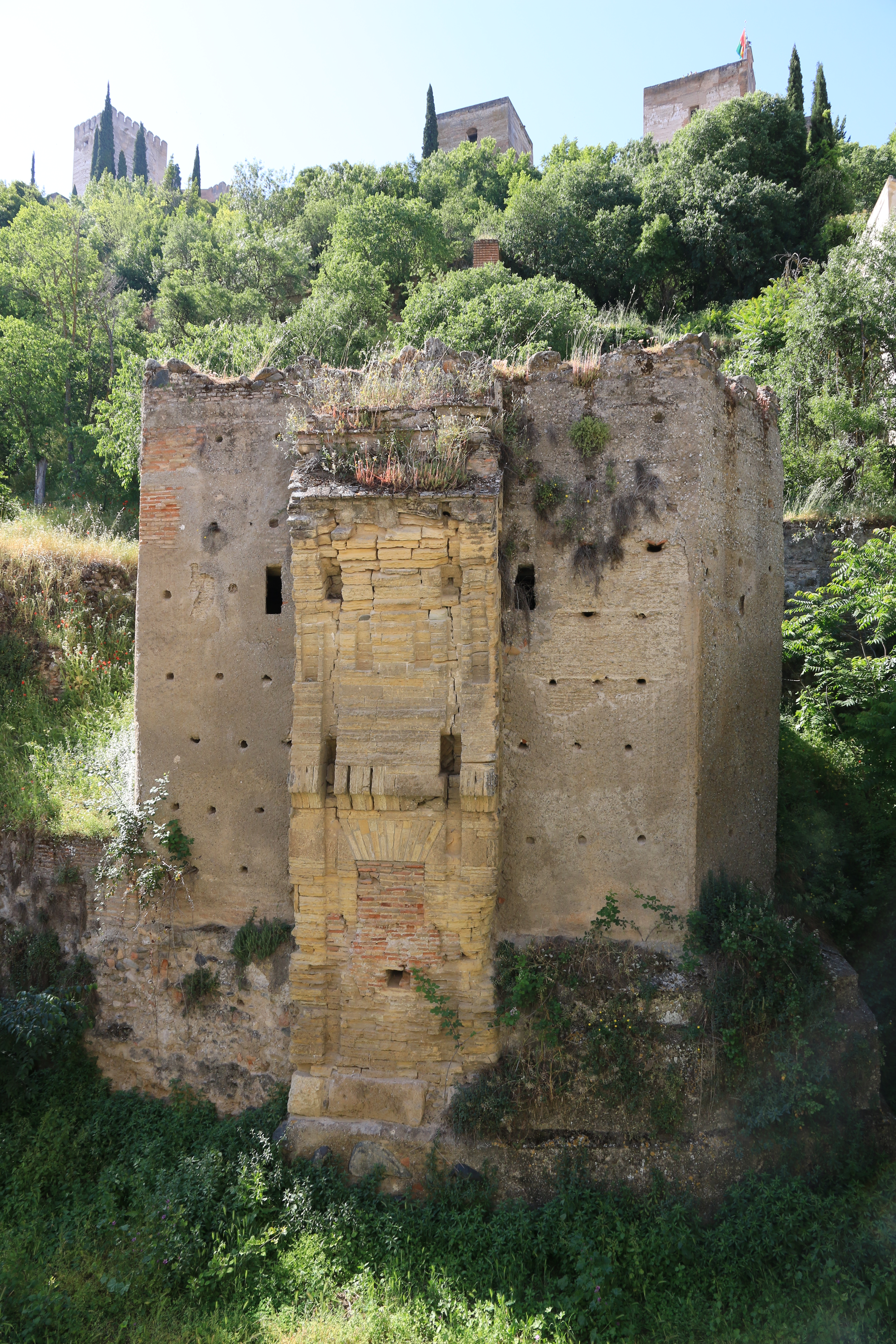
Remains of the Puente del Cadí (formerly Bāb al-Difāf), an 11th-century Zirid fortification that enabled soldiers on the Sabika hill to access the river during times of siege

The evidence for a Roman presence is unclear but archaeologists have found remains of ancient foundations on the Sabika hill. A fortress or citadel, probably dating from the Visigothic period, existed on the hill in the 9th century. The first reference to the Qal‘at al-Ḥamra was during the battles between the Arabs and the Muladies during the rule of ‘Abdallah ibn Muhammad (r. 888–912). According to surviving documents from the era, the red castle was quite small, and its walls were not capable of deterring an army intent on conquering. The first reference to al-Ḥamrāʼ came in lines of poetry attached to an arrow shot over the ramparts, recorded by Ibn Hayyan (d. 1076):

"Deserted and roofless are the houses of our enemies;
Invaded by the autumnal rains, traversed by impetuous winds;
Let them within the red castle (Kalat al hamra) hold their mischievous councils;
Perdition and woe surround them on every side."

At the beginning of the 11th century, the region of Granada was dominated by the Zirids, a Sanhaja Berber group and offshoot of the Zirids who ruled parts of North Africa. When the Caliphate of Córdoba collapsed after 1009 and the Fitna (civil war) began, the Zirid leader Zawi ben Ziri established an independent kingdom for himself, the Taifa of Granada. The Zirids built their citadel and palace, known as the al-Qaṣaba al-Qadīma ("Old Citadel" or "Old Palace"), on the hill now occupied by the Albaicín neighbourhood. It was connected to two other fortresses on the Sabika and Mauror hills to the south. On the Darro River, between the Zirid citadel and the Sabika hill, was a sluice gate called Bāb al-Difāf ("Gate of the Tambourines"), (Note: The gate is known today as the Puente del Cadí ("Bridge of the Qadi") or the Puerta de los Tableros ("Gate of the Boards"), and all that remains of it is one of its hexagonal towers with fragments of its large horseshoe archway.) which could be closed to retain water if needed. This gate was part of the fortification connecting the Zirid citadel with the fortress on the Sabika hill and it also formed part of a coracha (from Arabic qawraja), a type of fortification allowing soldiers from the fortress to access the river and bring back water even during times of siege. The Sabika hill fortress, also known as al-Qasaba al-Jadida ("the New Citadel"), was later used for the foundations of the current Alcazaba of the Alhambra. Under the Zirid kings Habbus ibn Maksan and Badis, the most powerful figure in the kingdom was the Jewish administrator known as Samuel ha-Nagid (in Hebrew) or Isma'il ibn Nagrilla (in Arabic). Samuel built his own palace on the Sabika hill, possibly on the site of the current palaces, although nothing remains of it. It reportedly included gardens and water features. (Note: A 1956 theory by Frederick Bargebuhr that the lion sculptures in the current Court of the Lions came from Samuel's palace has since been challenged and refuted by other scholars.)

=== Nasrid period ===
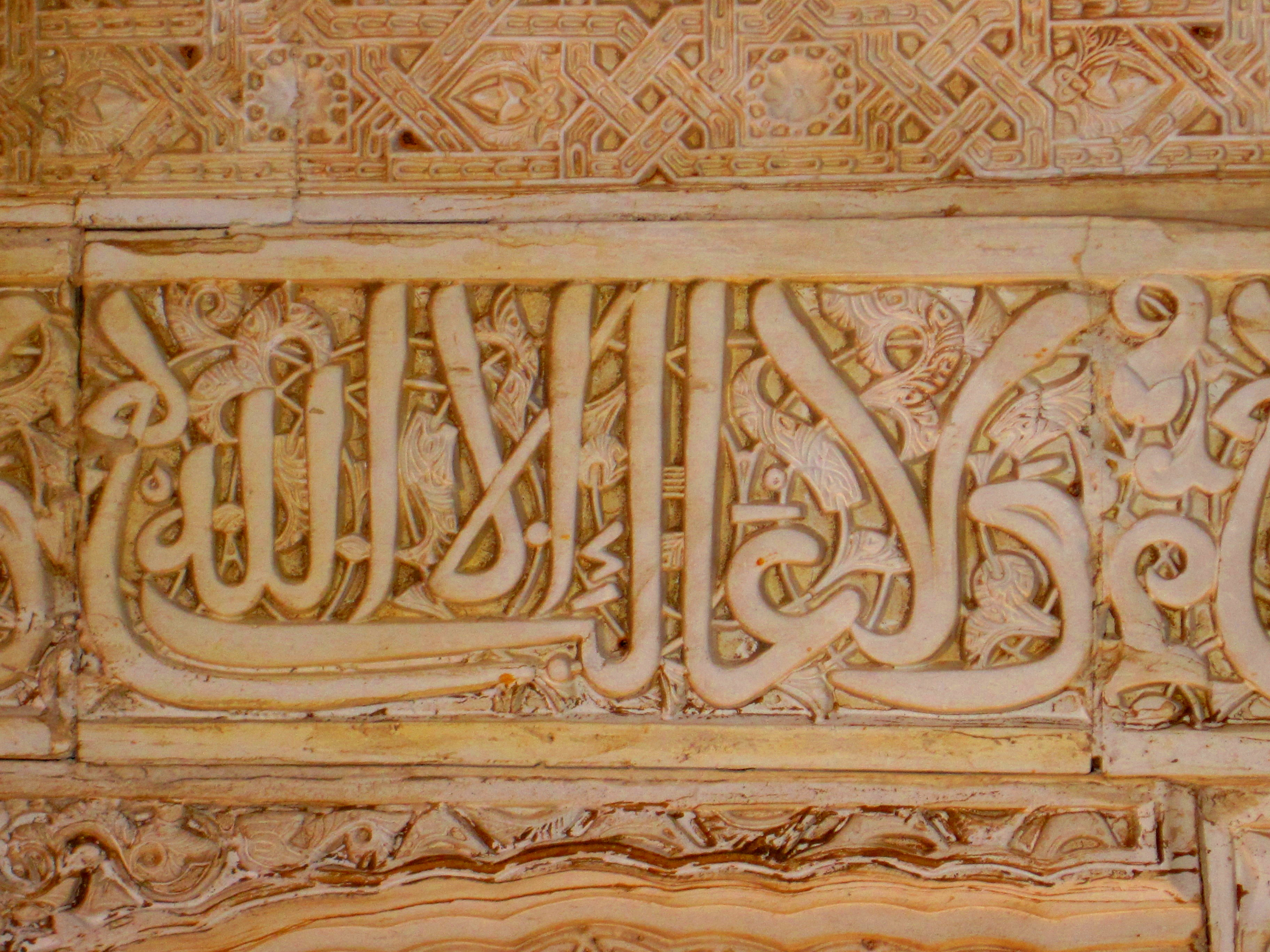
Islamic calligraphy in the Mexuar Hall: و لا غالب إلا الله, "There is no victor but God", a motto used by the Nasrid dynasty

The period of the Taifa kingdoms, during which the Zirids ruled, came to an end with the conquest of al-Andalus by the Almoravids from North Africa during the late 11th century. In the mid-12th century they were followed by the Almohads. After 1228 Almohad rule collapsed and local rulers and factions emerged again across the territory of al-Andalus. With the Reconquista in full swing, the Christian kingdoms of Castile and Aragon – under kings Ferdinand III and James I, respectively – made major conquests across al-Andalus. Castile captured Cordoba in 1236 and Seville in 1248. Meanwhile, Ibn al-Ahmar (Muhammad I) established what became the last and longest reigning Muslim dynasty in the Iberian peninsula, the Nasrids, who ruled the Emirate of Granada. Ibn al-Ahmar was a relatively new political player in the region and likely came from a modest background, but he was able to win the support and consent of multiple Muslim settlements under threat from the Castilian advance.

Upon settling in Granada in 1238, Ibn al-Ahmar initially resided in the old citadel of the Zirids on the Albaicin hill, but that same year he began construction of the Alhambra as a new residence and citadel. According to an Arabic manuscript since published as the Anónimo de Madrid y Copenhague,

This year, 1238 Abdallah ibn al-Ahmar climbed to the place called "the Alhambra". He examined it, marked the foundations of a castle and left someone in charge of directing the work, and before that year had passed, the construction of the ramparts was completed; water was brought in from the river and a channel carrying the water was built (...)

During the reign of the Nasrid Dynasty, the Alhambra was transformed into a palatine city, complete with an irrigation system composed of aqueducts and water channels that provided water for the complex and for other nearby countryside palaces such as the Generalife. Previously, the old fortresses on the hill had been dependent on rainwater collected from the cistern near the Alcazaba and on what could be brought up from the Darro River below. The creation of the Sultan's Canal (Arabic: ساقلتة السلطان, romanized: Saqiyat al-Sultan), which brought water from the mountains to the east, solidified the identity of the Alhambra as a palace-city rather than a defensive and ascetic structure. This first hydraulic system was expanded afterwards and included two long water channels and several sophisticated elevation devices to bring water onto the plateau.

The only elements preserved from the time of Ibn al-Ahmar are some of the fortification walls, particularly the Alcazaba at the western end of the complex. Ibn al-Ahmar did not have time to complete any major new palaces and he may have initially lived in one of the towers of the Alcazaba, before later moving to a modest house on the site of the current Palace of Charles V. Later Nasrid rulers after Ibn al-Ahmar continuously modified the site. Along with the fragile materials themselves, which needed regular repairs, this makes the exact chronology of its development difficult to determine.

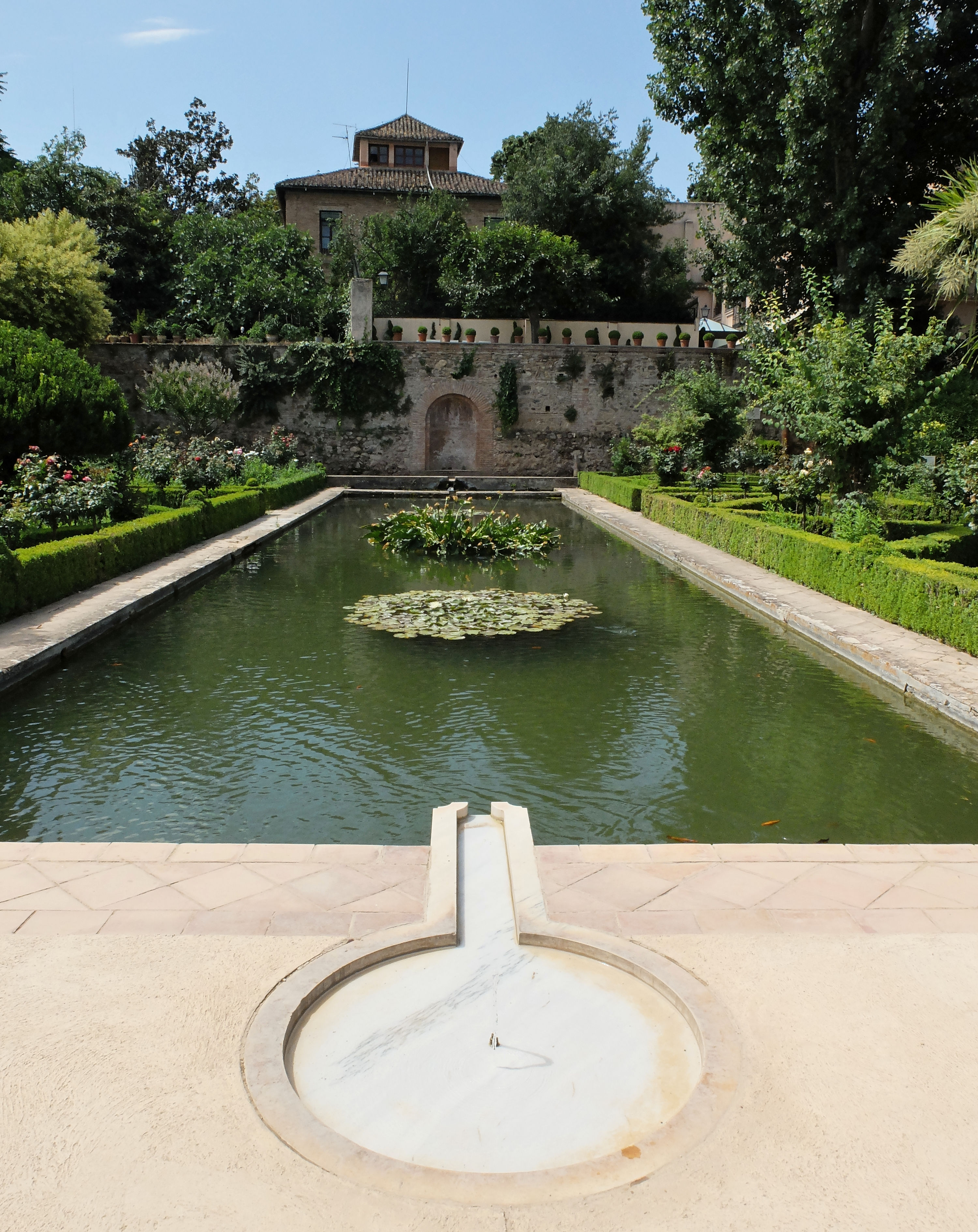
Present-day remains of the Palacio del Partal Alto, a palace likely built by Muhammad II (r. 1273–1302)

The oldest major palace for which some remains have been preserved is the structure known as the Palacio del Partal Alto, in an elevated location near the centre of the complex, which probably dates from the reign of Ibn al-Ahmar's son, Muhammad II (r. 1273–1302). To the south was the Palace of the Abencerrajes, and to the east was another private palace, known as the Palace of the Convent of San Francisco, (Note: Named after the Convent of Saint Francis which was installed here in 1494.) both of which were probably also originally constructed during the time of Muhammad II. Muhammad III (r. 1302–1309) erected the Partal Palace, parts of which are still standing today, as well as the Alhambra's main (congregational) mosque (on the site of the current Church of Santa Maria de la Alhambra). The Partal Palace is the earliest known palace to be built along the northern walls of the complex, with views onto the city below. It is also the oldest Nasrid palace still standing today.

Isma'il I (r. 1314–1325) undertook a significant remodelling of the Alhambra. His reign marked the beginning of the "classical" period of Nasrid architecture, during which many major monuments in the Alhambra were begun and decorative styles were consolidated. Isma'il decided to build a new palace complex just east of the Alcazaba to serve as the official palace of the sultan and the state, known as the Qaṣr al-Sultan or Dār al-Mulk. The core of this complex was the Comares Palace, while another wing of the palace, the Mexuar, extended to the west. The Comares Baths are the best-preserved element from this initial construction, as the rest of the palace was further modified by his successors. Near the main mosque Isma'il I also created the Rawda, the dynastic mausoleum of the Nasrids, of which only partial remains are preserved. Yusuf I (r. 1333–1354) carried out further work on the Comares Palace, including the construction of the Hall of Ambassadors and other works around the current Mexuar. He also built the Alhambra's main gate, the Puerta de la Justicia, and the Torre de la Cautiva, one of several small towers with richly decorated rooms along the northern walls.

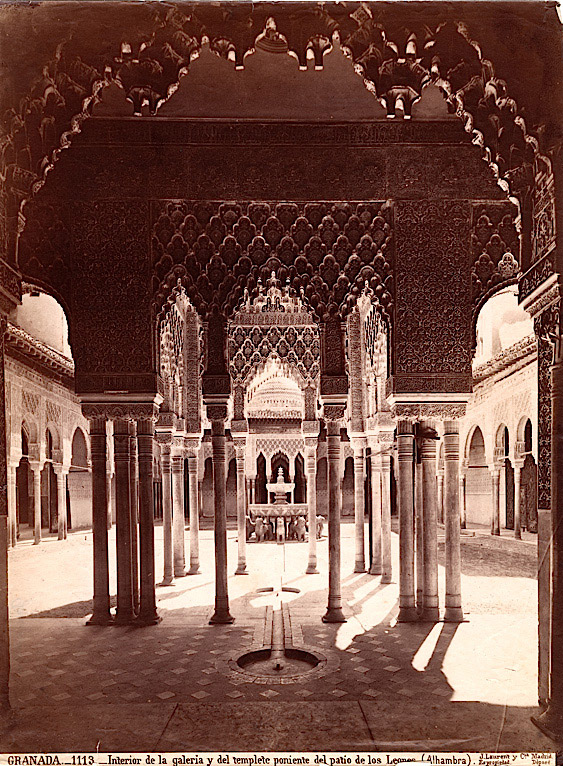
The Court of the Lions in 1871. This palace, still preserved today, was built during the second reign of Muhammad V (1362–1391).

Muhammad V's reign (1354–1391, with interruptions) marked the political and cultural apogee of the Nasrid emirate as well as the apogee of Nasrid architecture. Particularly during his second reign (after 1362), there was a stylistic shift towards more innovative architectural layouts and an extensive use of complex muqarnas vaulting. His most significant contribution to the Alhambra was the construction of the Palace of the Lions to the east of the Comares Palace in an area previously occupied by gardens. He also remodelled the Mexuar, created the highly decorated "Comares Façade" in the Patio del Cuarto Dorado, and redecorated the Court of the Myrtles, giving these areas much of their final appearance.

After Muhammad V, relatively little major construction work occurred in the Alhambra. One exception is the Torre de las Infantas, which dates from the time of Muhammad VII (1392–1408). The 15th century saw the Nasrid dynasty in decline and in turmoil, with few significant construction projects and a more repetitive, less innovative style of architecture.

=== Reconquista and Christian Spanish period ===
The last Nasrid sultan, Muhammad XI of Granada, surrendered the Emirate of Granada in January 1492, without the Alhambra itself being attacked, when the forces of the Catholic Monarchs, King Ferdinand II of Aragon and Queen Isabella I of Castile, took the surrounding territory with a force of overwhelming numbers. Muhammad XI moved the remains of his ancestors from the complex, as was verified by Leopoldo Torres Balbás in 1925, when he found seventy empty tombs. The remains are now likely to be located in Mondújar in the principality of Lecrín.

After the conquest, the Alhambra became a royal palace and property of the Spanish Crown. Isabella and Ferdinand initially took up residence here and stayed in Granada for several months, up until 25 May 1492. It was during this stay that two major events happened. On 31 March the monarchs signed the Alhambra Decree, which ordered the expulsion of all Jews in Spain who refused to convert. Christopher Columbus, who had also been present to witness the surrender of Granada, presented his plans for an expedition across the Atlantic to the monarchs in the Hall of Ambassadors and on 17 April they signed the contract which set the terms for the expedition which landed in the Americas later that year.

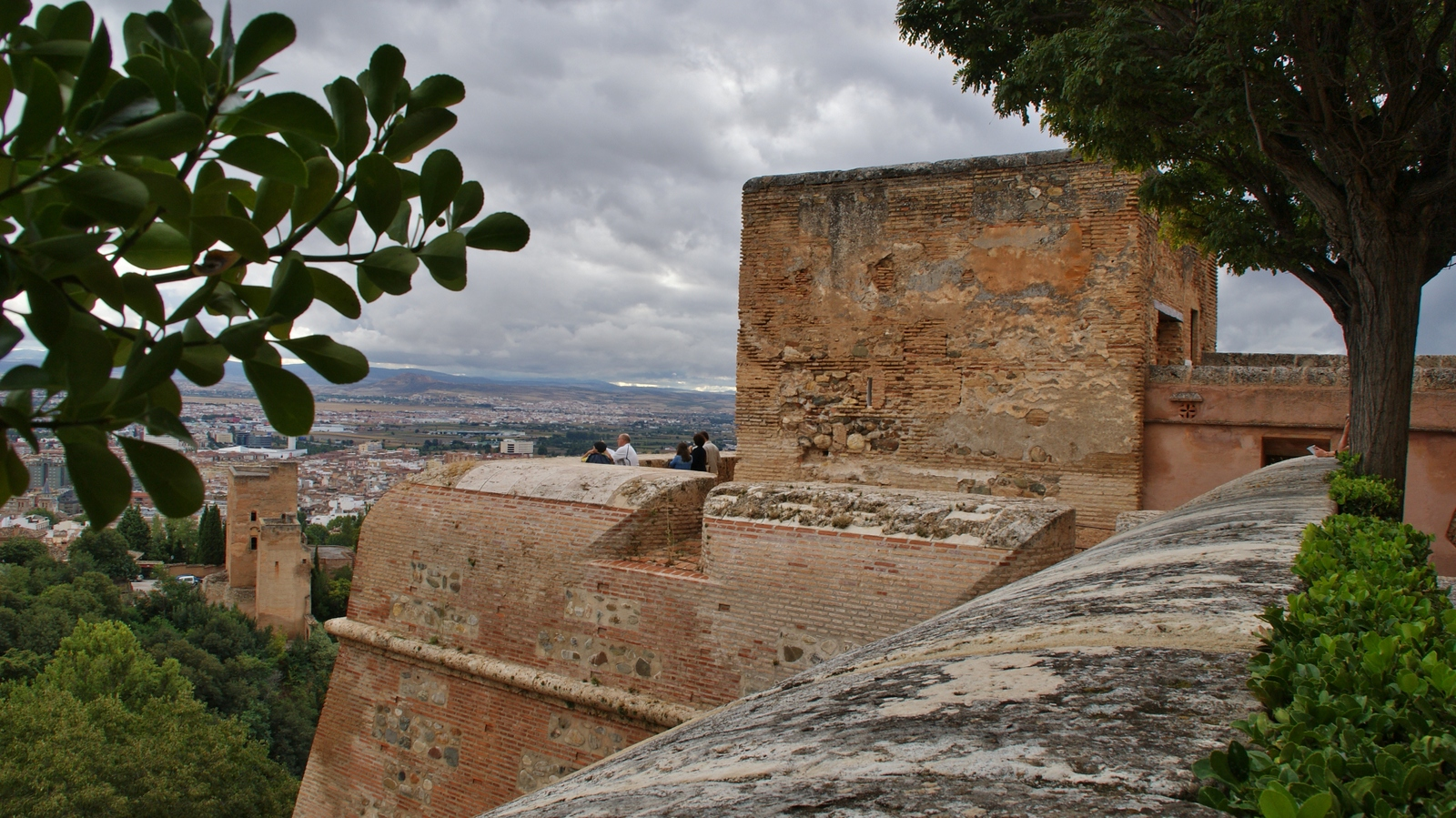
The Torre de la Pólvora at the Alcazaba, an example of a tower reinforced with curved ramparts in the 16th century to better defend against modern artillery

The new Christian rulers began to make additions and alterations to the palace complex. The governorship of the Alhambra was entrusted to the Tendilla family, who were given one of the Nasrid palaces, the Palacio del Partal Alto (near the Partal Palace), to use as family residence. Iñigo López de Mendoza y Quiñones (d. 1515), the second Count of Tendilla, was present in Ferdinand II's entourage when Muhammad XI surrendered the keys to the Alhambra and he became the Alhambra's first Spanish governor. For almost 24 years after the conquest, he made repairs and modifications to its fortifications in order to better protect it against gunpowder artillery attacks. Multiple towers and fortifications – such as the Torre de Siete Suelos, the Torre de las Cabezas, and the Torres Bermejas – were built or reinforced in this period, as seen by the addition of semi-round bastions. In 1512 the Count was also awarded the property of Mondéjar and subsequently passed on the title of Marquis of Mondéjar to his descendants.

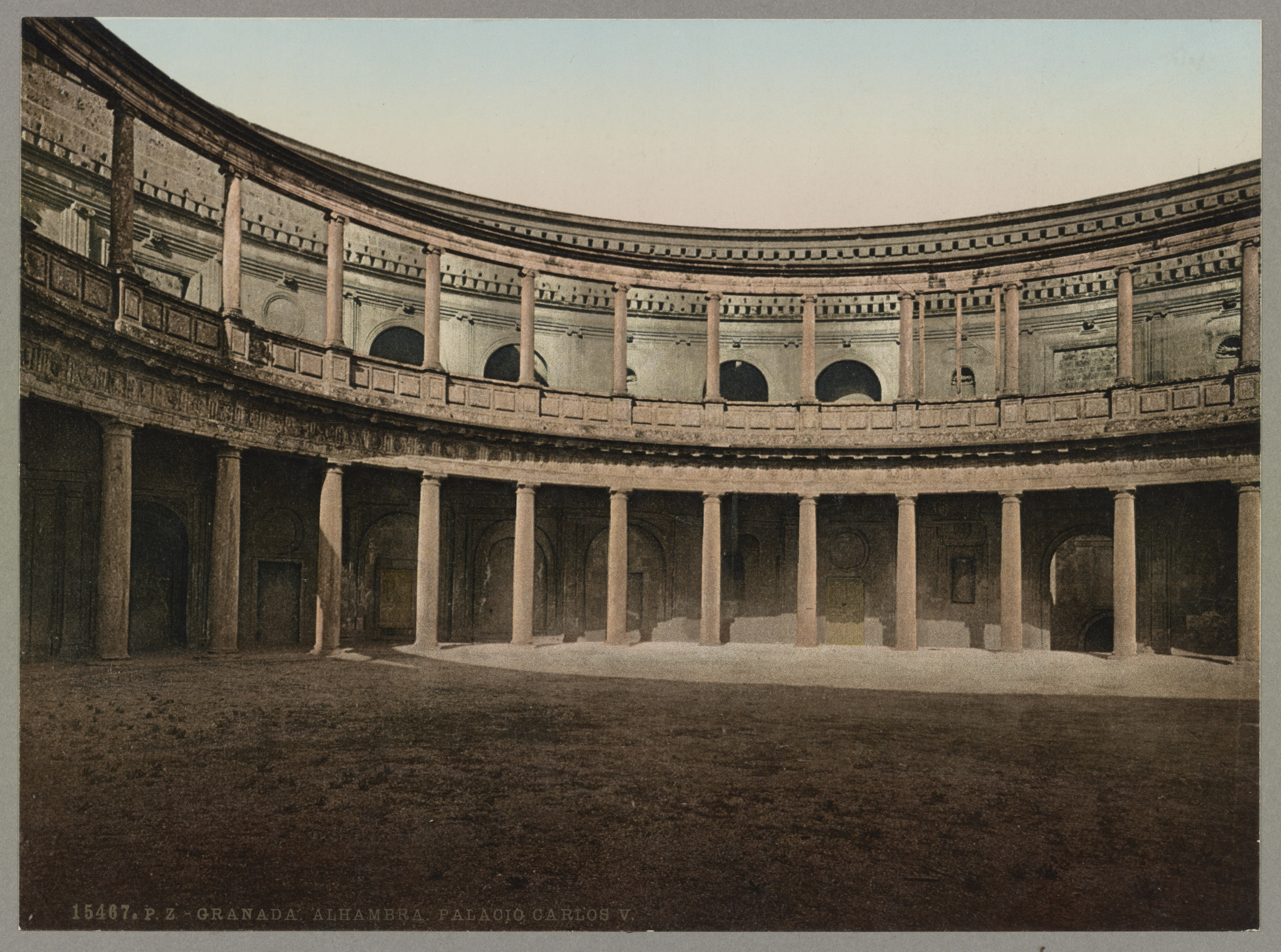
The Renaissance-style Palace of Charles V, begun in 1527 but left unfinished after 1637. This 1890 photograph shows the roof still missing over the upper floor.

Charles V (r. 1516–1556) visited the Alhambra in 1526 with his wife Isabella of Portugal and decided to convert it into a royal residence for his use. He rebuilt or modified portions of the Nasrid palaces to serve as royal apartments, a process which began in 1528 and was completed in 1537. He also demolished a part of the Comares Palace to make way for a monumental new palace, known as the Palace of Charles V, designed in the Renaissance style of the period. Construction of the palace began in 1527 but it was eventually left unfinished after 1637.

The governorship of the Tendilla-Mondéjar family came to an end in 1717–1718, when Philip V confiscated the family's properties in the Alhambra and dismissed the Marquis of Mondéjar, José de Mendoza Ibáñez de Segovia (1657–1734), from his position as mayor (alcaide) of the Alhambra, in retaliation for the Marquis opposing him in the War of the Spanish Succession. The departure of the Tendilla-Mondéjar family marked the beginning of the Alhambra's most severe period of decline. During this period the Spanish state dedicated few resources to it and its management was taken over by self-interested local governors who lived with their families inside the neglected palaces.

Over subsequent years the Alhambra was further damaged. Between 1810 and 1812 Granada was occupied by Napoleon's army during the Peninsular War. The French troops, under the command of Count Sebastiani, occupied the Alhambra as a fortified position and caused significant damage to the monument. Upon evacuating the city, they attempted to dynamite the whole complex to prevent it from being re-used as a fortified position. They successfully blew up eight towers before the remaining fuses were disabled by Spanish soldier José Garcia, whose actions saved what remains today. In 1821, an earthquake caused further damage. In the early 19th century, the site was described as being occupied by prisoners, disabled soldiers and other marginalized people.

=== Recovery and modern restorations ===
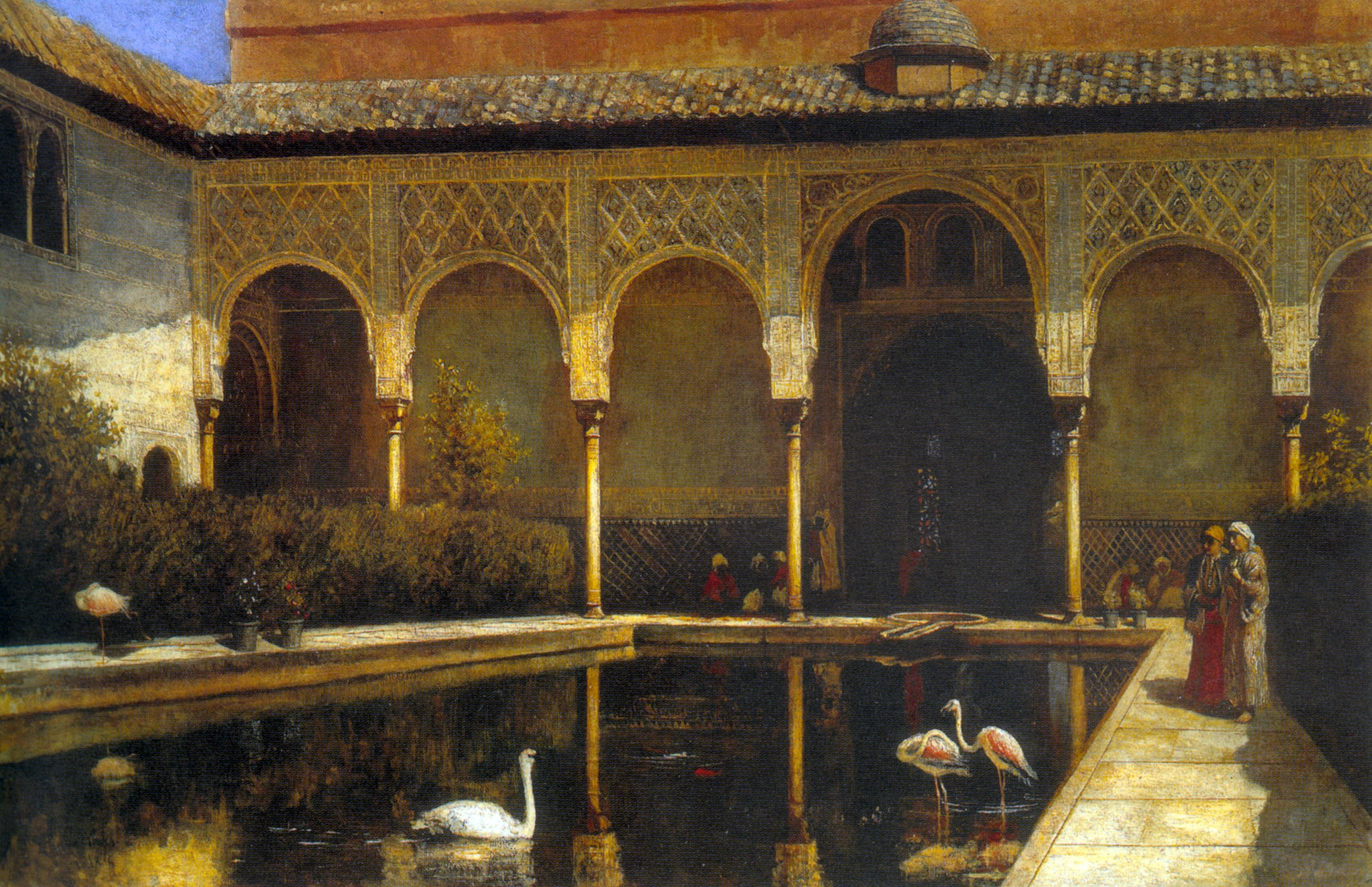
A Court in the Alhambra at the Time of the Moors, Edwin Lord Weeks, 1876

As early as the second half of the 18th century, the Alhambra's appearance and details began to be documented by Spanish illustrators and officials. By the first decade of the 19th century, other European writers began to bring attention to it, and the site subsequently became an object of fascination for Western Romanticist writers, whose publications frequently sought to evoke a contrast between the ornate architecture of the former Moorish palaces and their current state of ruin and neglect. This also coincided with a growing European interest in the Orient (Orientialism), which encouraged an emphasis on exoticism and on the "oriental" attributes of the Alhambra. This rediscovery of the Alhambra was led mostly by French, British, and German writers. In 1830, the American writer Washington Irving lived in Granada and wrote his Tales of the Alhambra, first published in 1832, which played a major role in spurring international interest in southern Spain and in its Islamic-era monuments like the Alhambra. Other artists and intellectuals, such as John Frederick Lewis, Richard Ford, François-René de Chateaubriand, and Owen Jones, helped make the Alhambra into an icon of the era with their writings and illustrations during the 19th century.

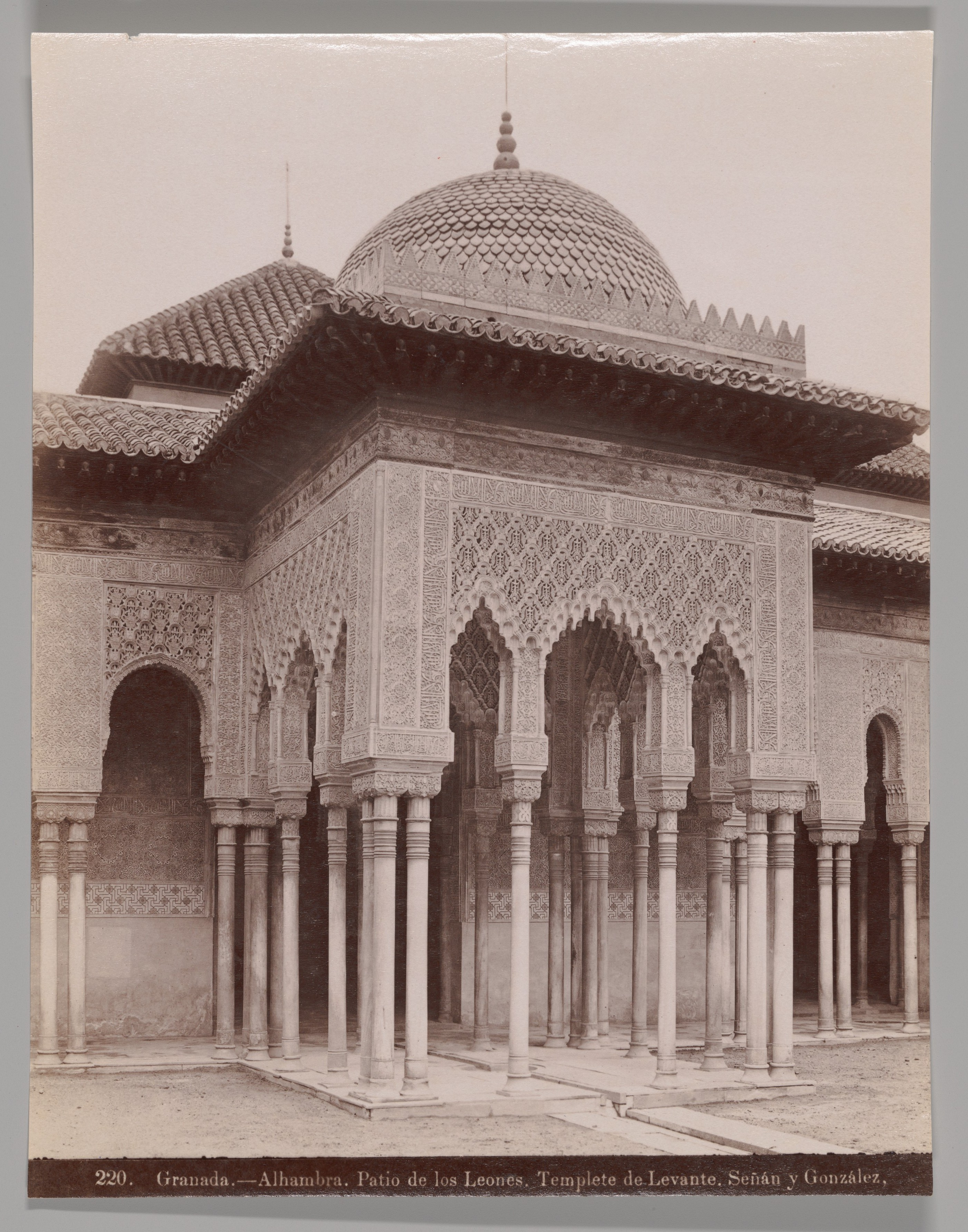
Pavilion in the Court of the Lions in 19th-century photo, showing the "oriental" dome added by Rafael Contreras in 1859, later removed by Leopoldo Torres Balbás

Restoration work on the Alhambra was undertaken in 1828 by the architect José Contreras, endowed in 1830 by Ferdinand VII. After the death of Contreras in 1847, it was continued by his son Rafael (died 1890) and his grandson Mariano Contreras (died 1912). The Contreras family members continued to be the most important architects and conservators of the Alhambra up until 1907. During this period, they generally followed a theory of "stylistic restoration", which favoured the construction and addition of elements to make a monument "complete" but not necessarily corresponding to any historical reality. They added elements which they deemed to be representative of what they thought was an "Arabic style", emphasizing the Alhambra's purported "Oriental" character. For example, in 1858–1859 Rafael Contreras and Juan Pugnaire added Persian-looking spherical domes to the Court of the Lions and to the northern portico of the Court of the Myrtles, even though these had nothing to do with Nasrid architecture.

In 1868, a revolution deposed Isabella II and the government seized the properties of the Spanish monarchy, including the Alhambra. In 1870 the Alhambra was declared a National Monument of Spain and the state allocated a budget for its conservation, overseen by the Provincial Commission of Monuments. Mariano Contreras, the last of the Contreras architects to serve as director of conservation of the Alhambra, was appointed as architectural curator in April 1890. His tenure was controversial and his conservation strategy attracted criticism from other authorities. In September 1890, a fire destroyed a large part of the Sala de la Barca in the Comares Palace, which highlighted the site's vulnerability. A report was commissioned in 1903. This resulted in the creation of a "Special Commission" in 1905. The Special Commission was tasked to oversee conservation and restoration of the Alhambra. The commission ultimately failed to exercise control due to friction with Contreras. In 1907, Mariano Contreras was replaced with Modesto Cendoya, whose work was also criticized. Cendoya began many excavations in search of new artifacts but often left these works unfinished. He restored some important elements of the site, like the water supply system, but neglected others. Due to continued friction with Cendoya, the Special Commission was dissolved in 1913 and replaced with the council (Patronato) of the Alhambra in 1914, which was charged again with overseeing the site's conservation and Cendoya's work. In 1915, it was linked directly to the Directorate-General of Fine Arts of the Ministry of Public Education (later the Ministry of National Education). Like Mariano Contreras before him, Cendoya continued to clash with the supervisory body and to obstruct their control. He was eventually dismissed from his post in 1923.

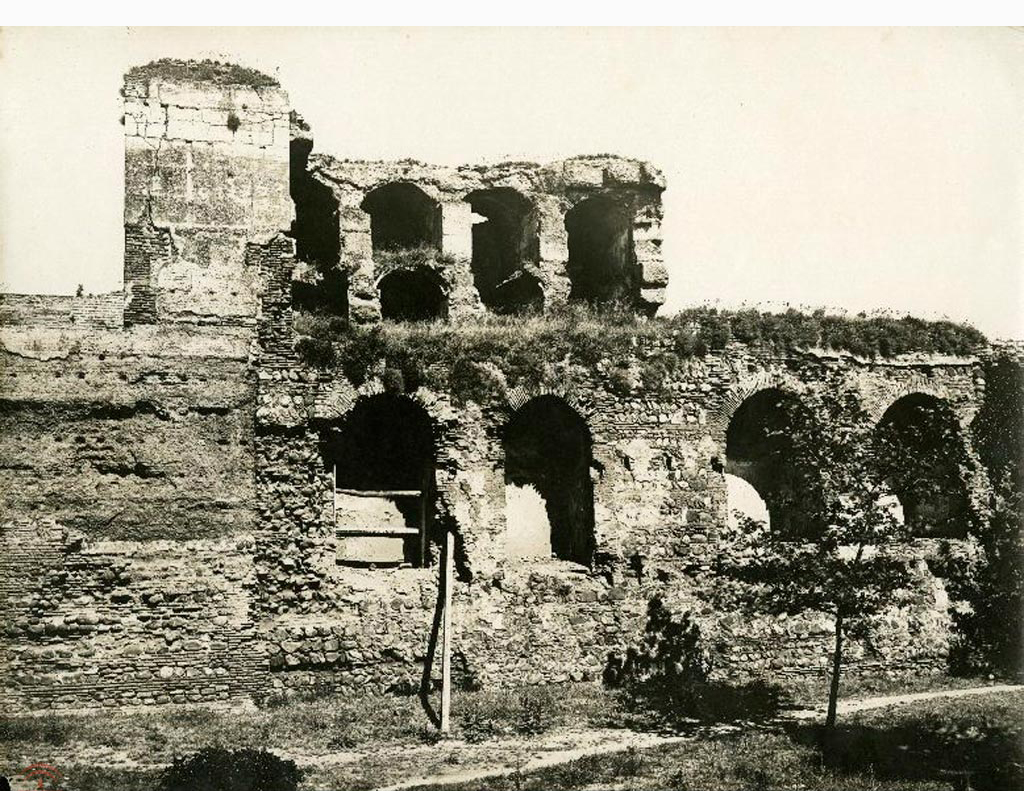
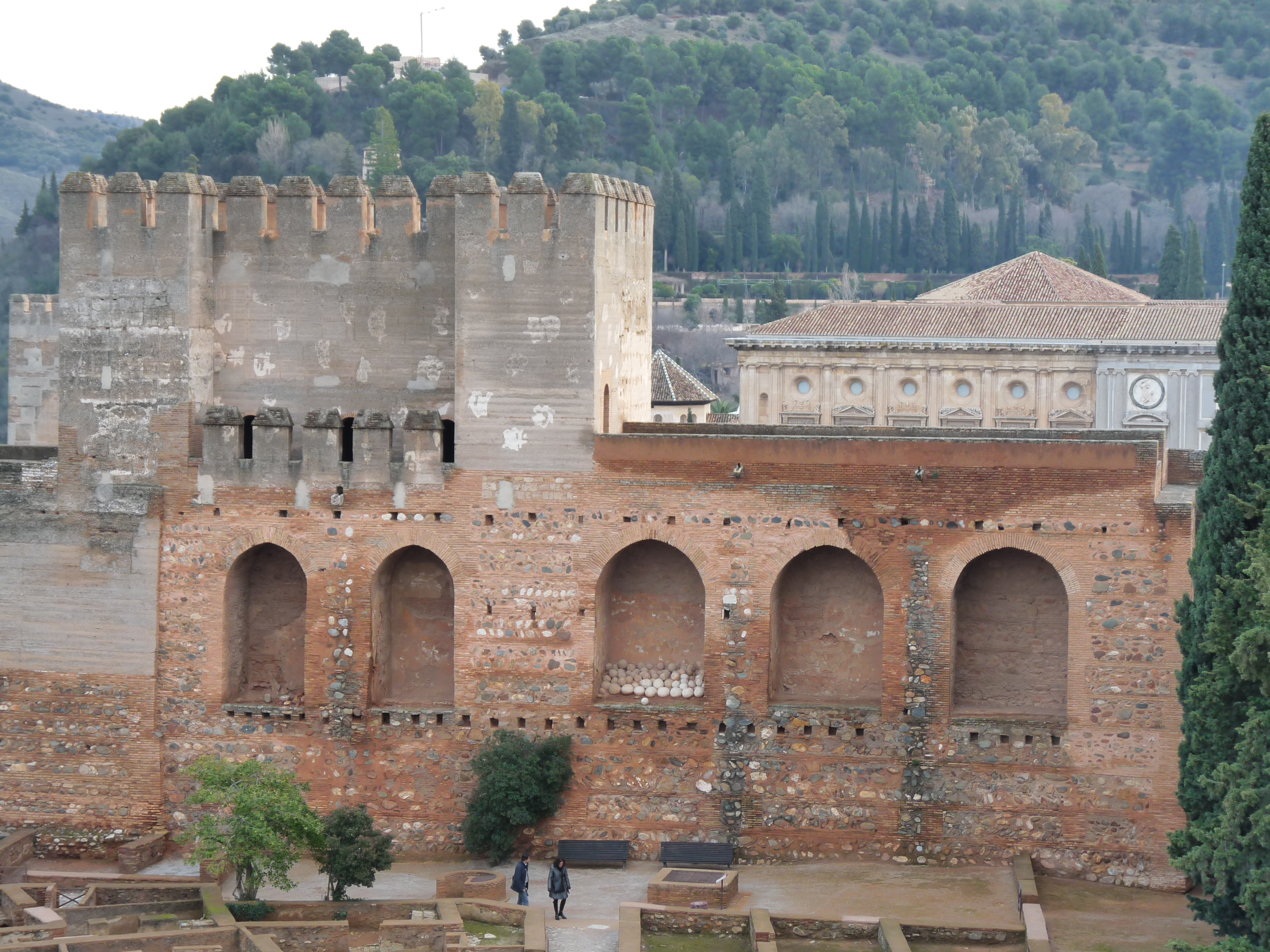
The Alcazaba before and after 20th-century restoration work (view of the Torre Quebrada)

After Cendoya, Leopoldo Torres Balbás was appointed as chief architect from 1923 to 1936. The appointment of Torres Balbás, a trained archaeologist and art historian, marked a definitive shift to a more scientific and systematic approach to the Alhambra's conservation. He endorsed the principles of the 1931 Athens Charter for the Restoration of Monuments, which emphasized regular maintenance, respect for the work of the past, legal protection for heritage monuments, and the legitimacy of modern techniques and materials in restoration so long as these were visually recognizable. Many of the buildings in the Alhambra were affected by his work. Some of the inaccurate changes and additions made by the Contreras architects were reversed. The young architect "opened arcades that had been walled up, re-excavated filled-in pools, replaced missing tiles, completed inscriptions that lacked portions of their stuccoed lettering, and installed a ceiling in the still unfinished palace of Charles V". He also carried out systematic archaeological excavations in various parts of the Alhambra, unearthing lost Nasrid structures such as the Palacio del Partal Alto and the Palace of the Abencerrajes which provided deeper insight into the former palace-city as a whole.

The work of Torres Balbás was continued by his assistant, Francisco Prieto Moreno, who was the chief architectural curator from 1936 to 1970. In 1940, a new Council of the Alhambra was created to oversee the site, which has remained in charge ever since. (Note: The Council was known as the "Council of the Alhambra and of the Palace of Charles V" until 1951, when it became known as the "Council of the Alhambra and the Generalife".) In 1984 the central government in Madrid transferred responsibility for the site to the Regional Government of Andalusia and in 1986 new statutes and documents were developed to regulate the planning and protection of the site. In 1984, the Alhambra and Generalife were also listed as a UNESCO World Heritage Site. The Alhambra is now one of the most popular tourist destinations in Spain. Research, archaeological investigations, and restoration works have also remained ongoing into the 21st century.

On 18 August 2026, the Alhambra palace was temporarily closed for an inspection of the damage following an earthquake that occurred near Granada.

== Layout ==
Modern plan of the Alhambra

The Alhambra site is about 700–740 m (2,300–2,430 ft) in length and about 200–205 m (660–670 ft) at its greatest width. It extends from west-northwest to east-southeast and covers an area of about 142,000 m^{2} (1,530,000 ft^{2}; 35 acres). It stands on a narrow promontory overlooking the Vega or Plain of Granada and carved by the river Darro on its north side as it descends from the Sierra Nevada. The red earth from which the fortress is constructed is a granular aggregate held together by a medium of red clay which gives the resulting layered brick- and stone- reinforced construction (tapial calicastrado) its characteristic hue and is at the root of the name of 'the Red Hill'.

The Alhambra's most westerly feature is the Alcazaba, a large fortress overlooking the city. Due to touristic demand, modern access runs contrary to the original sequence which began from a principal access via the Puerta de la Justicia (Gate of Justice) onto a large souq or public market square facing the Alcazaba, now subdivided and obscured by later Christian-era development. From the Puerta del Vino (Wine Gate) ran the Calle Real (Royal Street) dividing the Alhambra along its axial spine into a southern residential quarter, with mosques, hamams (bathhouses) and diverse functional establishments, and a greater northern portion, occupied by several palaces of the nobility with extensive landscaped gardens commanding views over the Albaicín.

The rest of the plateau comprises a number of earlier and later Moorish palaces, enclosed by a fortified wall, with thirteen defensive towers, some (such as the Torre de la Infanta and Torre de la Cautiva) containing elaborate vertical palaces in miniature. The river Darro passes through a ravine on the north and divides the plateau from the Albaicín district of Granada. Similarly, the Sabika Valley, containing the Alhambra Park, lies on the west and south, and, beyond this valley, the almost parallel ridge of Monte Mauror separates it from the Antequeruela district. Another ravine separates it from the Generalife, the summer pleasure gardens of the emir. Salmerón Escobar notes that the later planting of deciduous elms obscures the overall perception of the layout, so a better reading of the original landscape is given in winter when the trees are bare.

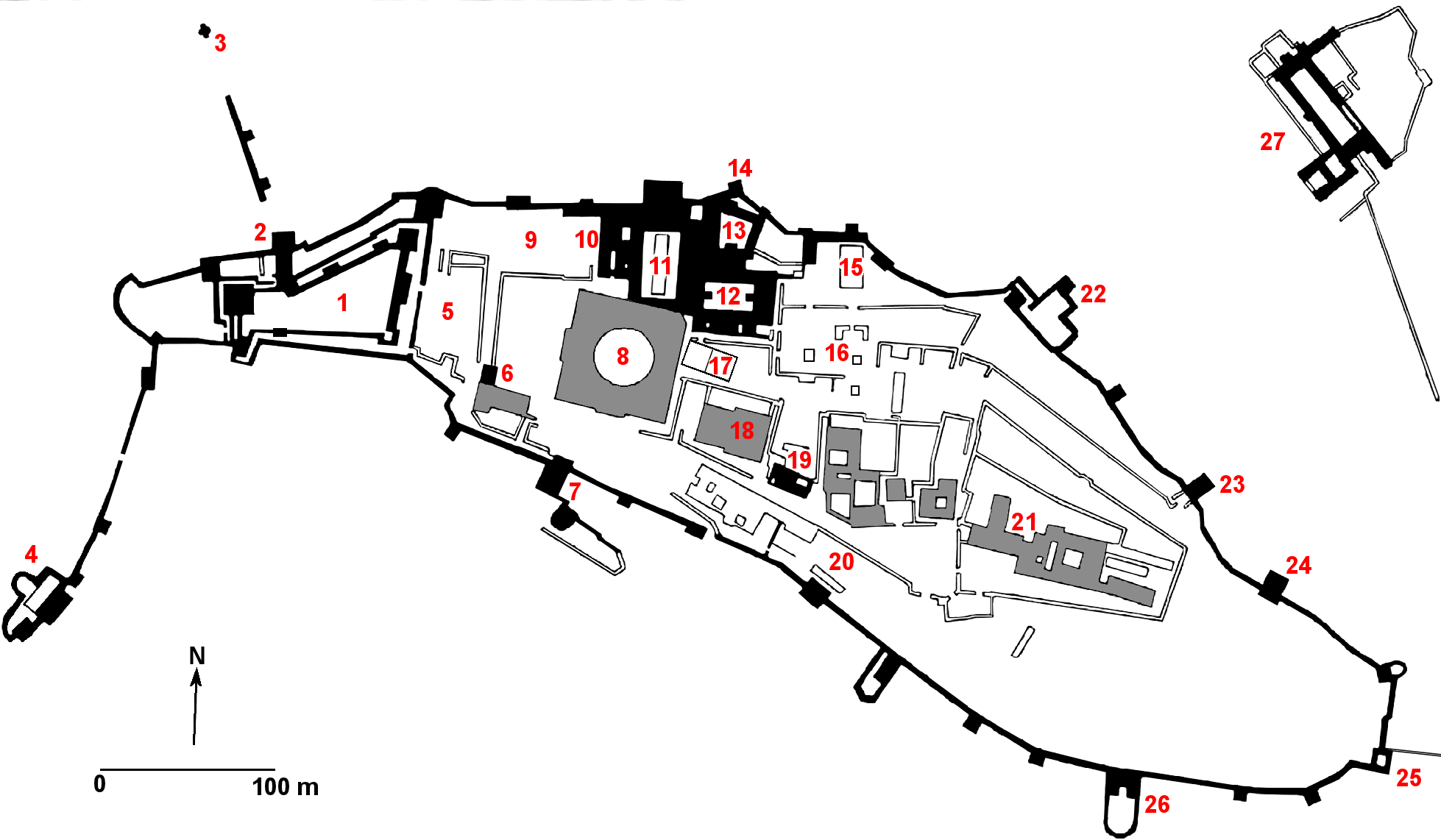
Layout and important features:

1. Alcazaba
2. Puerta de las Armas
3. Puente del Cadí
4. Torres Bermejas
5. Plaza de los Aljibes
6. Puerta del Vino
7. Puerta de la Justicia
8. Palace of Charles V
9. Mexuar courtyards
10. Mexuar main hall
11. Comares Palace
12. Palace of the Lions
13. Lindaraja Courtyard
14. Peinador de la Reina
15. Partal Palace
16. Palacio del Partal Alto
17. Rawda mausoleum
18. Church of Santa Maria
19. Baths of the Mosque
20. Palace of the Abencerrajes
21. Palace of the Convent of San Francisco
22. Torre de los Picos
23. Torre de la Cautiva
24. Torre de las Infantas
25. Torre del Agua
26. Puerta de los Siete Suelos
27. Generalife Palace

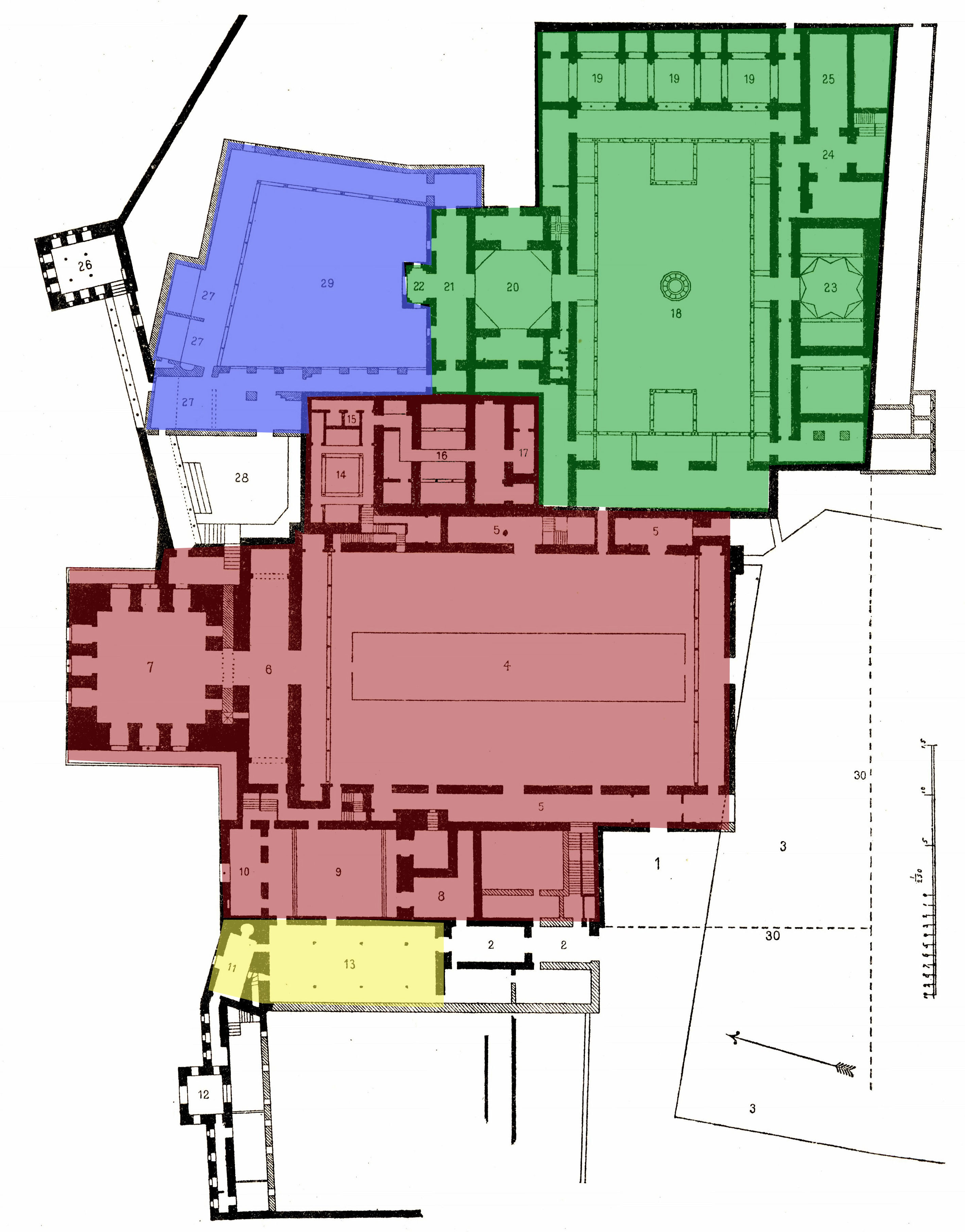
Close-up plan of the Nasrid Palaces (from 1889):
Mexuar (main hall)
Comares Palace
Palace of the Lions
Courtyard of Lindaraja

== Architecture ==
=== General design ===
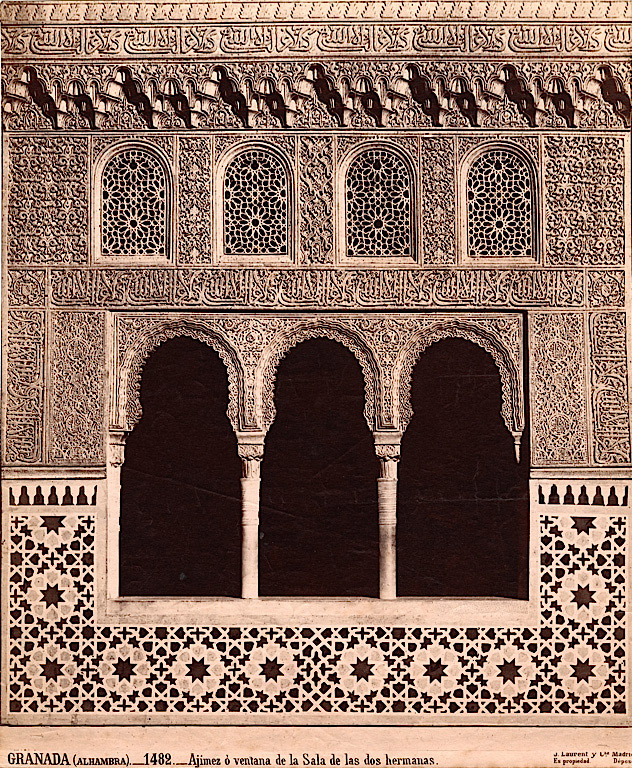
Mullioned windows of the Hall of the Two Sisters in the Alhambra, by Jean Laurent, c. 1874. Stucco decoration can be seen on the upper walls while geometric tile mosaic is seen below.

The design and decoration of the Nasrid palaces are a continuation of Moorish (western Islamic) architecture from earlier centuries but developed their own characteristics. The combination of carefully proportioned courtyards, water features, gardens, arches on slender columns, and intricately sculpted stucco and tile decoration gives Nasrid architecture qualities that are described as ethereal and intimate. Walls were built mostly in rammed earth, lime concrete, or brick and then covered with plaster, while wood (mostly pine) was used for roofs, ceilings, doors, and window shutters.

Buildings were designed to be seen from within and so their decoration was focused on the inside. The basic unit of Nasrid palace architecture was a rectangular courtyard with a pool, fountain, or water channel at its centre. Courtyards were flanked on two or four sides by halls, often preceded by arcaded porticoes. Many of these structures featured a mirador, a room projecting outward from the rest of the building and commanding scenic views of gardens or of the city. Buildings were designed with a mathematical proportional system that gives them a harmonious visual quality. The layout of the courtyards, the distribution of windows, and the use of water features were designed with the climate in mind, cooling and ventilating the environment in summer while minimizing cold drafts and maximizing sunlight in winter. Upper-floor rooms were smaller and more enclosed, making them more suited for use during the winter. Courtyards were usually aligned in a north–south direction which allows the main halls to receive direct sunlight at midday during the winter, while during the summer the higher midday sun is blocked by the position and depth of the porticos fronting these halls.

=== Architects and poets ===
Little is known about the architects and craftsmen who built the Alhambra, but more is known about the Dīwān al-Ins͟hā', or chancery. This institution seems to have played an increasingly important role in the design of buildings, probably because inscriptions came to feature so prominently in their decoration. The head of the chancery was often also the vizier (prime minister) of the sultan. Although not exactly architects, the terms of office of many individuals in these positions coincide with the major phases of construction in the Alhambra, which suggests that they played a role in leading construction projects. The most important figures who held these positions, such as Ibn al-Jayyab, Ibn al-Khatib, and Ibn Zamrak, also composed much of the poetry that adorns the walls of the Alhambra. Ibn al-Jayyab served as head of the chancery at various times between 1295 and 1349 under six sultans from Muhammad II to Yusuf I. Ibn al-Khatib served as both head of the chancery and as vizier for various periods between 1332 and 1371, under the sultans Yusuf I and Muhammad V. Ibn Zamrak served as vizier and head of the chancery for periods between 1354 and 1393, under Muhammad V and Muhammad VII.

=== Decoration ===
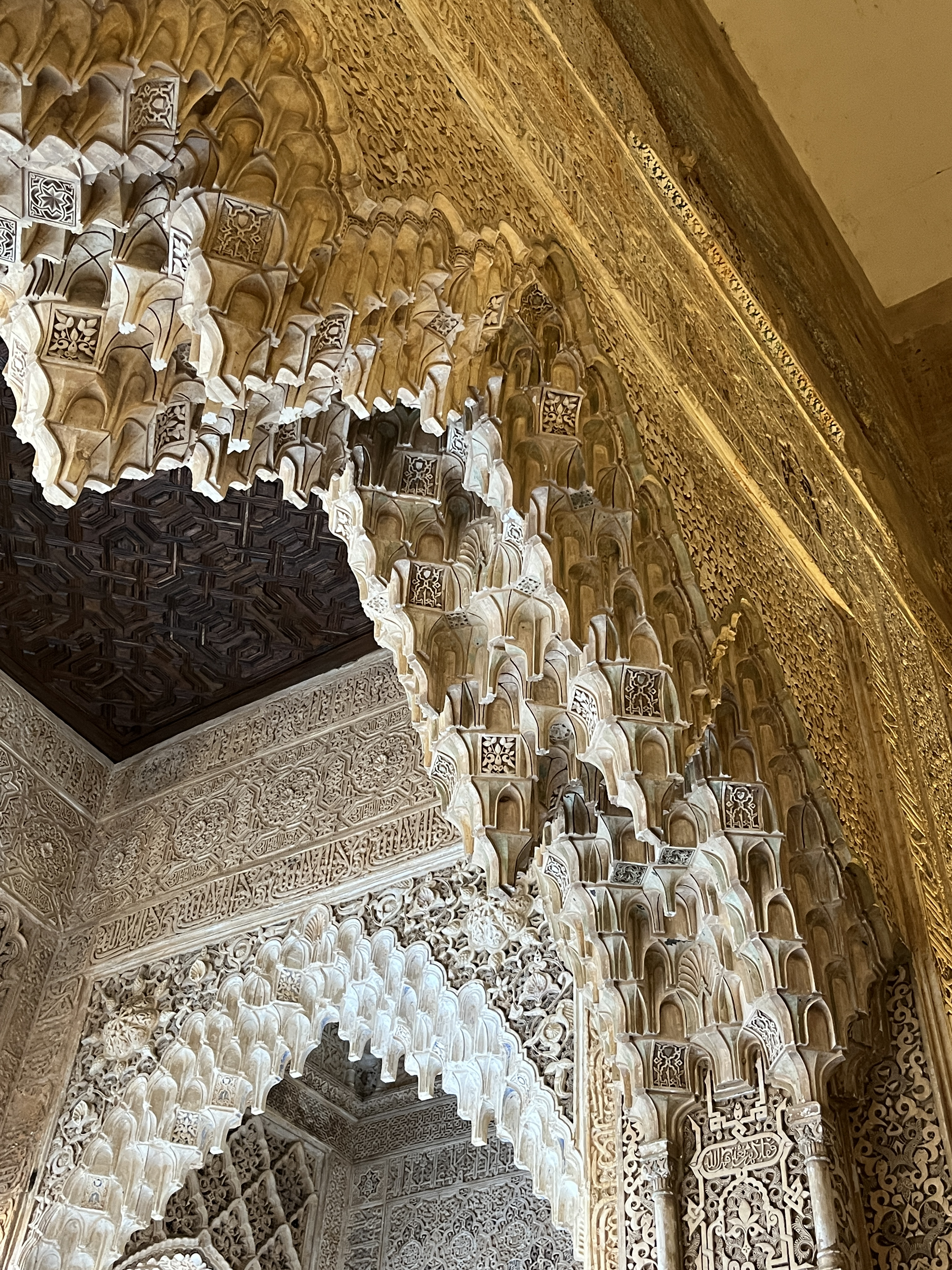
Stucco-carved muqarnas (or mocárabes) in the Palace of the Lions

Carved stucco (or yesería in Spanish) and mosaic tilework (zilīj or zellij in Arabic; (Note: The Arabic word zellij gave rise to the Spanish word azulejos, but the latter is now used to designate various ceramic artwork more generally.) alicatado in Spanish) were used for wall decoration, while ceilings were generally made in wood, which could be carved and painted in turn. Tile mosaics and wooden ceilings often feature geometric motifs. Tilework was generally used for lower walls or for floors, while stucco was used for upper zones. Stucco was typically carved with vegetal arabesque motifs (ataurique in Spanish, from Arabic: التوريق, romanized: al-tawrīq, lit. 'foliage'), epigraphic motifs, geometric motifs, or sebka motifs. It could be further sculpted into three-dimensional muqarnas (mocárabes in Spanish). Arabic inscriptions, a feature especially characteristic of the Alhambra, were carved along the walls and included Qur'anic excerpts, poetry by Nasrid court poets, and the repetition of the Nasrid motto "wa la ghalib illa-llah" (Arabic: ولا غالب إلا الله, lit. 'And there is no victor but God').

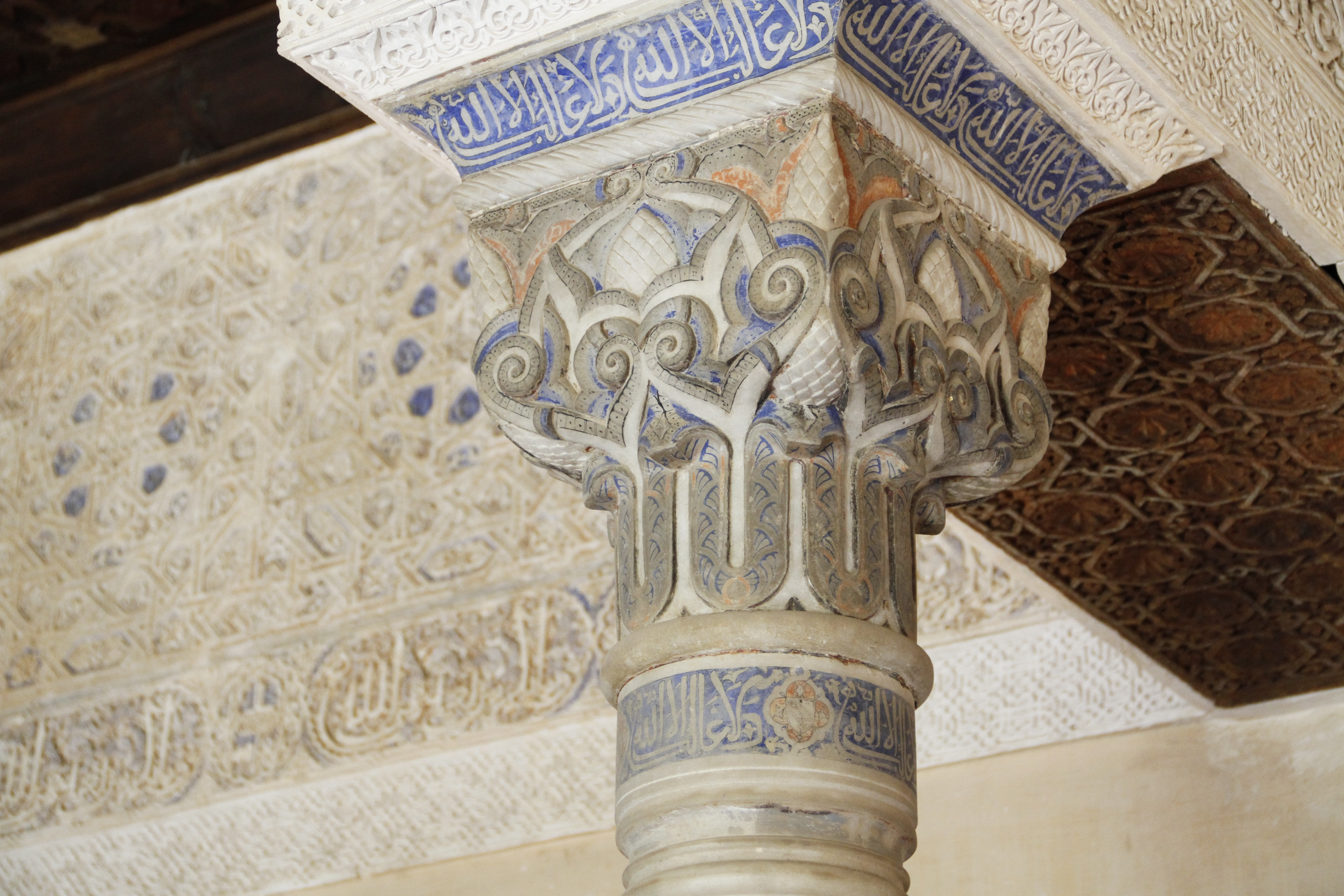
Example of a typical Nasrid capital (from the Sala del Mexuar), with some of its original colours preserved

White marble quarried from Macael (in Almeria province) was also used to make fountains and slender columns. The capitals of columns typically consisted of a lower cylindrical section sculpted with stylized acanthus leaves, an upper cubic section with vegetal or geometric motifs, and inscriptions (like the Nasrid motto) running along the base or the top edge.

While the stucco decoration, wooden ceilings, and marble capitals of the Alhambra often appear colourless or monochrome today, they were originally painted in bright colours. Primary colours – red, blue, and (in place of yellow) gold – were the most prominent and were juxtaposed to achieve a certain aesthetic balance, while other colours were used in more nuanced ways in the background.

==== Inscriptions ====
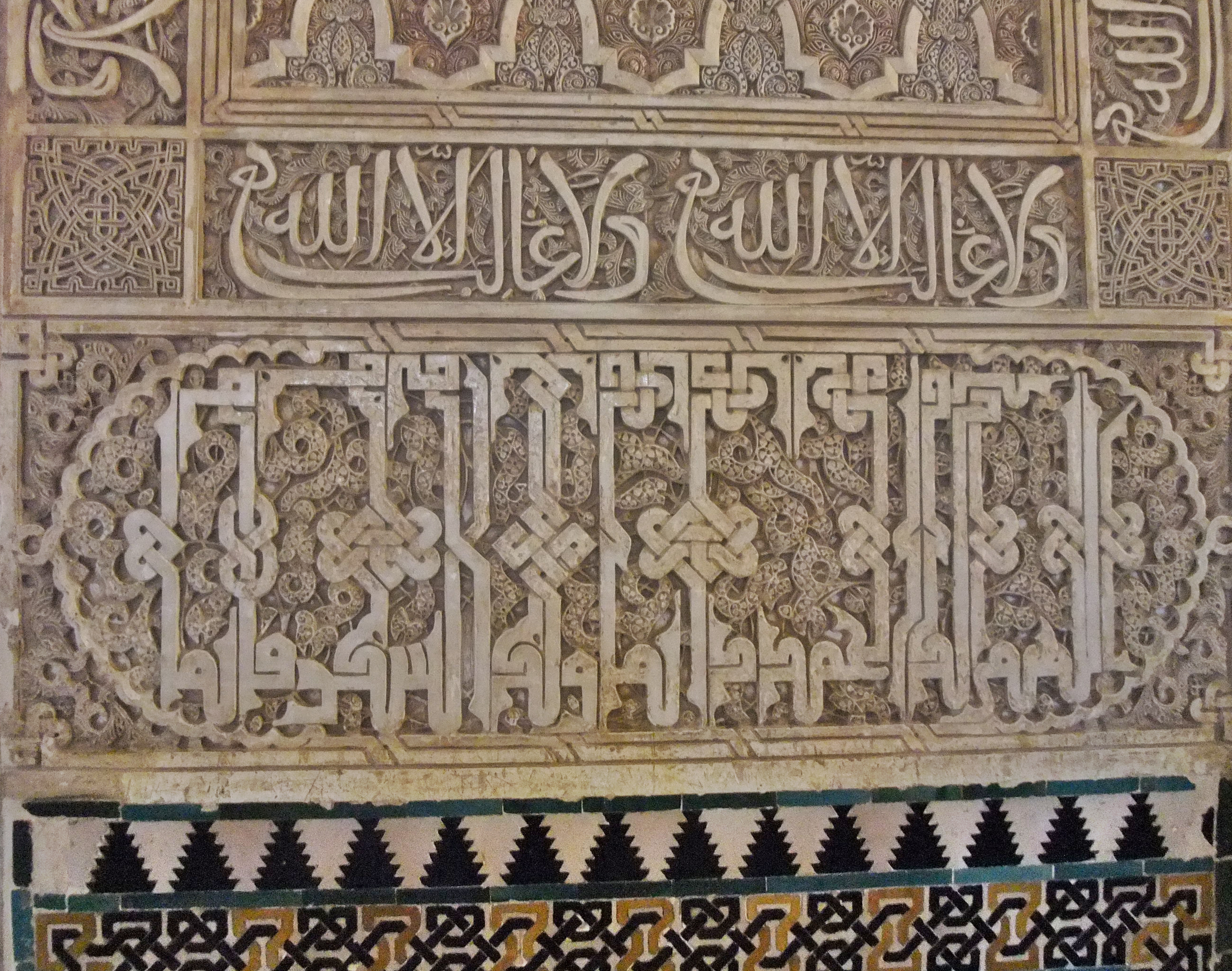
Calligraphy in the Hall of Ambassadors: above is a band of inscriptions that repeats the Nasrid motto ("And There is no victor but God") in cursive script, while below is a larger cartouche containing an inscription in "Knotted" Kufic

The Alhambra features various styles of the Arabic epigraphy that developed under the Nasrid dynasty, and particularly under Yusuf I and Muhammad V. José Miguel Puerta Vílchez compares the walls of the Alhambra to the pages of a manuscript, drawing similarities between the zilīj-covered dados and the geometric manuscript illuminations, and the epigraphical forms in the palace to calligraphic motifs in contemporary Arabic manuscripts. Inscriptions typically ran in vertical or horizontal bands or they were set inside cartouches of round or rectangular shape.

Most major inscriptions in the Alhambra use the Naskhi or cursive script, which was the most common script used in writing after the early Islamic period. Thuluth was a derivation of the cursive script often used for more pompous or formal contexts; favoured, for example, in the preambles of documents prepared by the Nasrid chancery. Many inscriptions in the Alhambra were composed in a mixed Naskhi-Thuluth script. Bands of cursive script often alternated with friezes or cartouches of Kufic script. Kufic is the oldest form of Arabic calligraphy, but by the 13th century Kufic scripts in the western Islamic world became increasingly stylized in architectural contexts and could be nearly illegible. In the Alhambra, there are many examples of "Knotted" Kufic, a particularly elaborate style where the letters tie together in intricate knots. The extensions of these letters could turn into strips that continued and formed more abstract motifs, or sometimes formed the edges of a cartouche encompassing the rest of the inscription.

The texts of the Alhambra include "devout, regal, votive, and Qur'anic phrases and sentences", formed into arabesques, carved into wood and marble, and glazed onto tiles. Poets of the Nasrid court, including Ibn al-Khatīb and Ibn Zamrak, composed poems for the palace. The inscriptions of the Alhambra are also unique for their frequent self-referential nature and use of personification. Some inscribed poems, such as those in the Palace of the Lions, talk about the palace or room in which they're situated and are written in the first person, as if the room itself was speaking to the reader. Most of the poetry is inscribed in Nasrid cursive script, while foliate and floral Kufic inscriptions—often formed into arches, columns, enjambments, and "architectural calligrams"—are generally used as decorative elements. Kufic calligrams, particularly of the words "blessing" (بركة baraka) and "felicity" (يمن yumn), are used as decorative motifs in arabesque throughout the palace. Like the rest of the original stucco decoration, many inscriptions were originally painted and enhanced with colours. Studies indicate that the letters were often painted in gold or silver, or in white with black outlines, which would have made them stand out on the decorated backgrounds that were often painted in red, blue, or turquoise (with other colours mixed into the details).

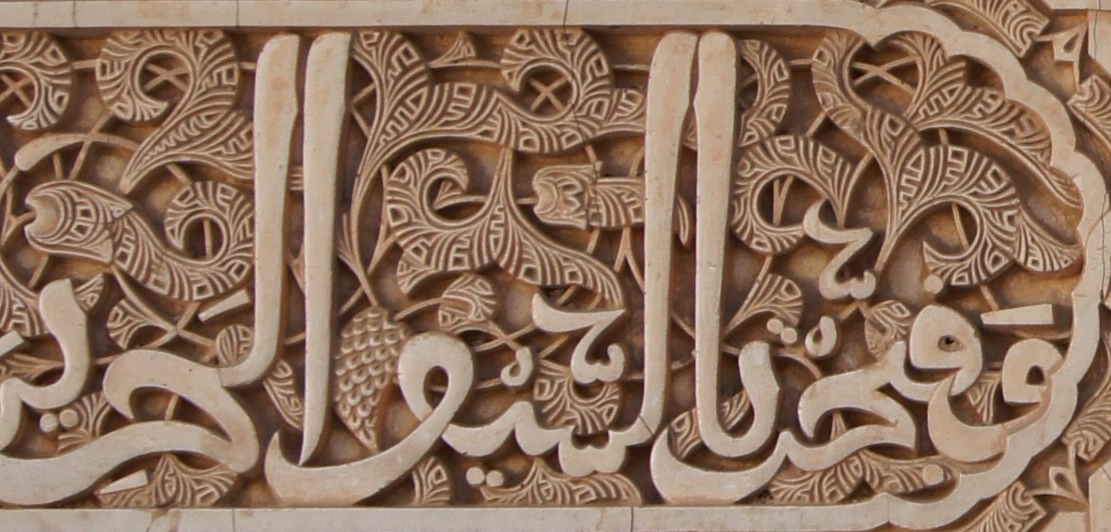
وفتحت بالسيف الجزيرة
"And the peninsula was conquered with the sword"

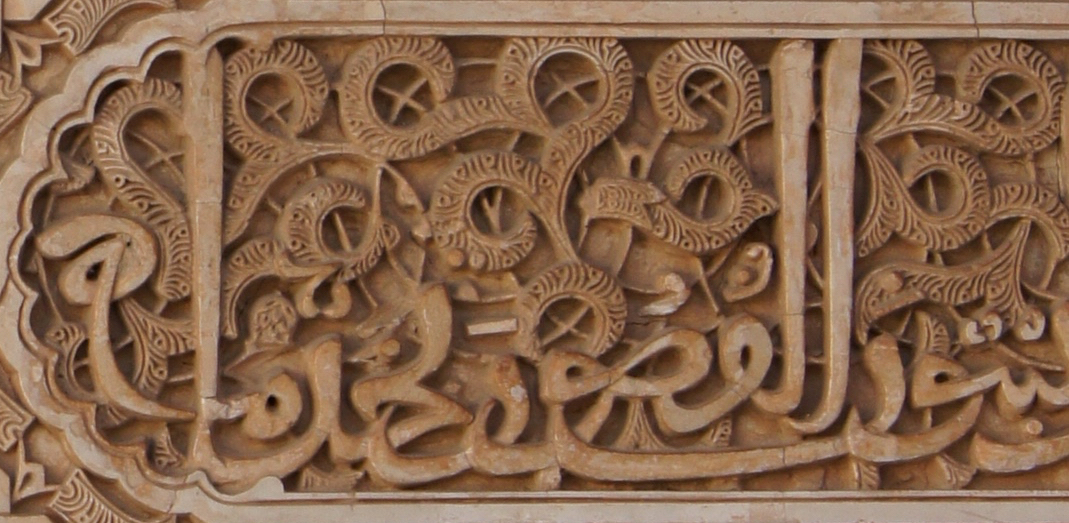
يبنون القصور تخدما
"They build palaces diligently"

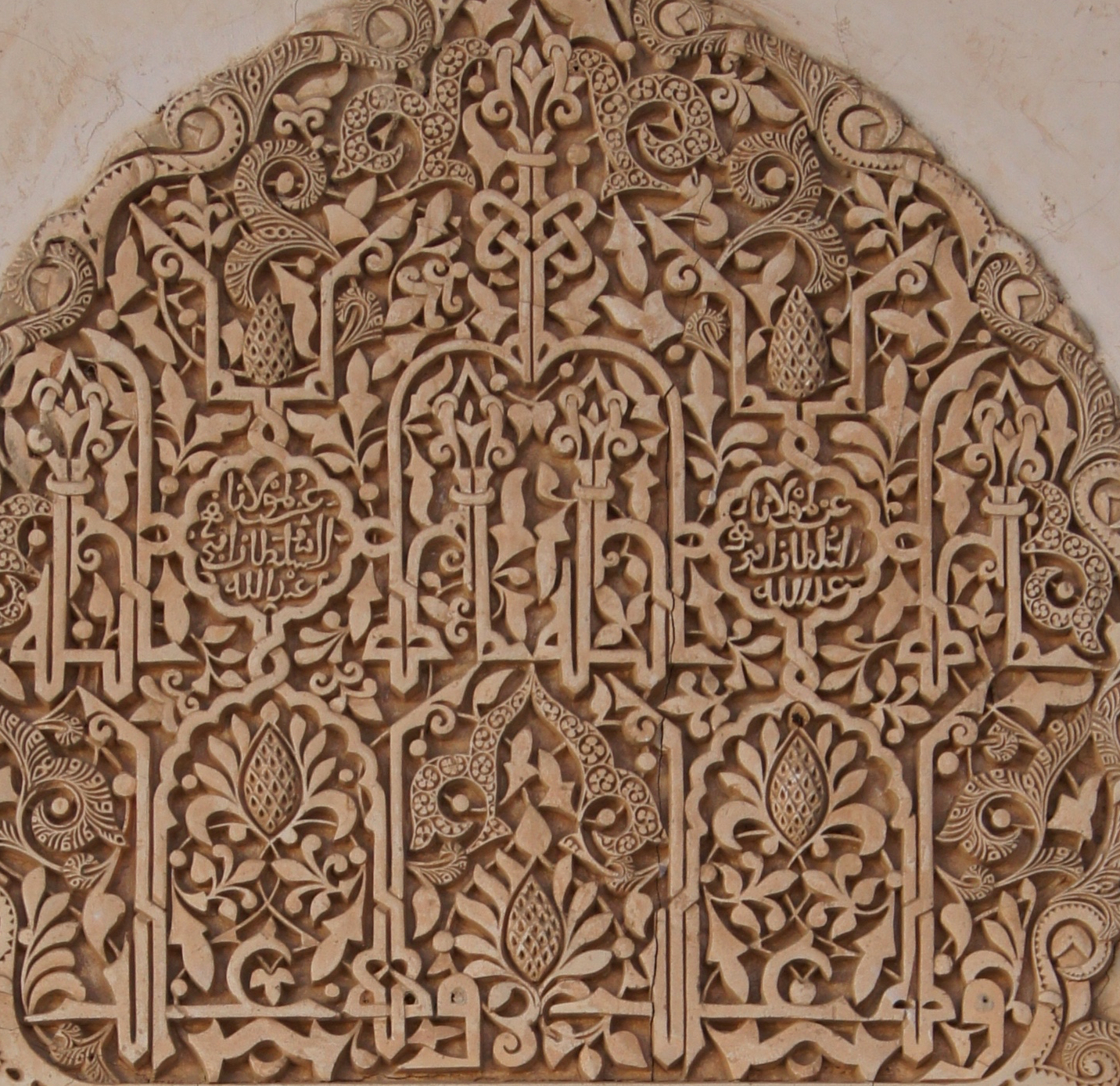
ولا غالب إلا الله
"There is no victor but God."

Epigraphic samples from the Court of the Myrtles: what Muhammad Kurd Ali described as Andalusi mushabbak (sinuous) script (خط أندلسي مُشَبَّك), or what Western sources refer to as Nasrid cursive (left and centre images) and floral Kufic script (right).

== Main structures ==
=== Entrance gates ===
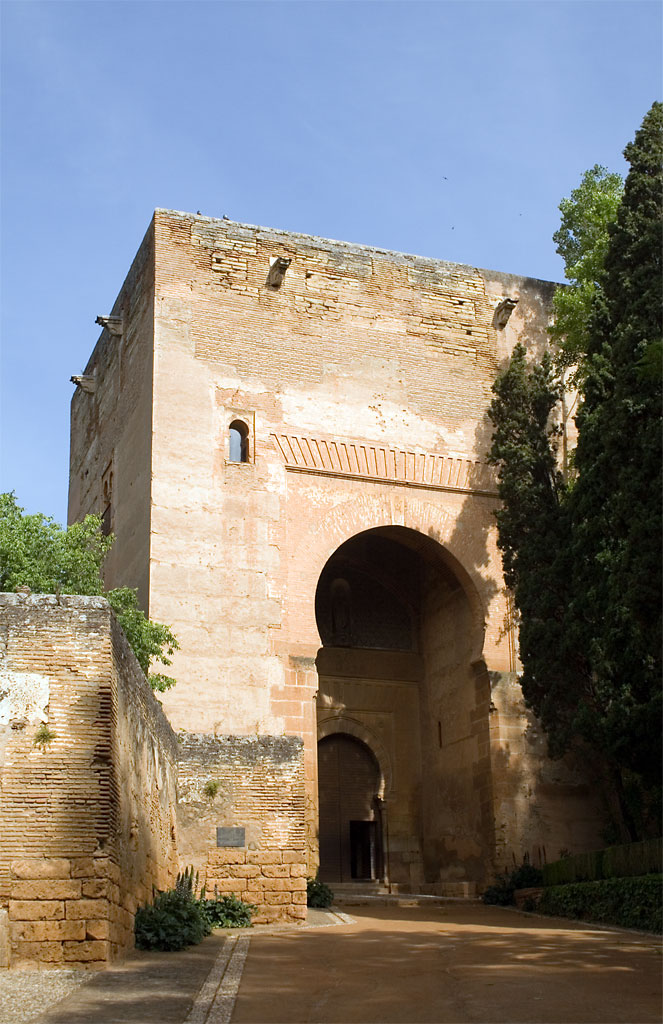
The Puerta de la Justicia (Gate of Justice), the main southern gate to the Alhambra, built by Yusuf I in 1348

The main gate of the Alhambra is the large Puerta de la Justicia (Gate of Justice), known in Arabic as Bab al-Shari'a (Arabic: باب الشريعة, lit. 'Gate of Shari'a (law)'), which served as the main entrance on the south side of the walled complex. It was built in 1348 during the reign of Yusuf I. The gate consists of a large horseshoe arch leading to a steep ramp passing through a bent passage. The passage turns 90 degrees to the left and then 90 degrees to the right, with an opening above where defenders could throw projectiles onto any attackers below. The image of a hand, whose five fingers symbolized the Five Pillars of Islam, is carved above the archway on the exterior façade, while the image of a key, another symbol of faith, is carved above the archway on the inner façade. A Christian-era sculpture of the Virgin and Christ Child was inserted later into another niche just inside the gate. Near the outside of the gate is the Pilar de Carlos V, a Renaissance-style fountain built in 1524 with some further alterations in 1624.

At the end of the passage coming from the Puerta de la Justicia is the Plaza de los Aljibes ('Place of the Cisterns'), a broad open space which divides the Alcazaba from the Nasrid Palaces. The plaza is named after a large cistern dating to around 1494, commissioned by Iñigo López de Mondoza y Quiñones. The cistern was one of the first works carried out in the Alhambra after the 1492 conquest and it filled what was previously a gully between the Alcazaba and the palaces. On the east side of the square is the Puerta del Vino (Wine Gate) which leads to the Palace of Charles V and to the former residential neighbourhoods (the medina) of the Alhambra. The gate's construction is attributed to the reign of Muhammad III, although the decoration dates from different periods. Both the inner and outer façades of the gate are embellished with ceramic decoration filing the spandrels of the arches and stucco decoration above. On the western side of the gate is the carving of a key symbol like the one on the Puerta de la Justicia.

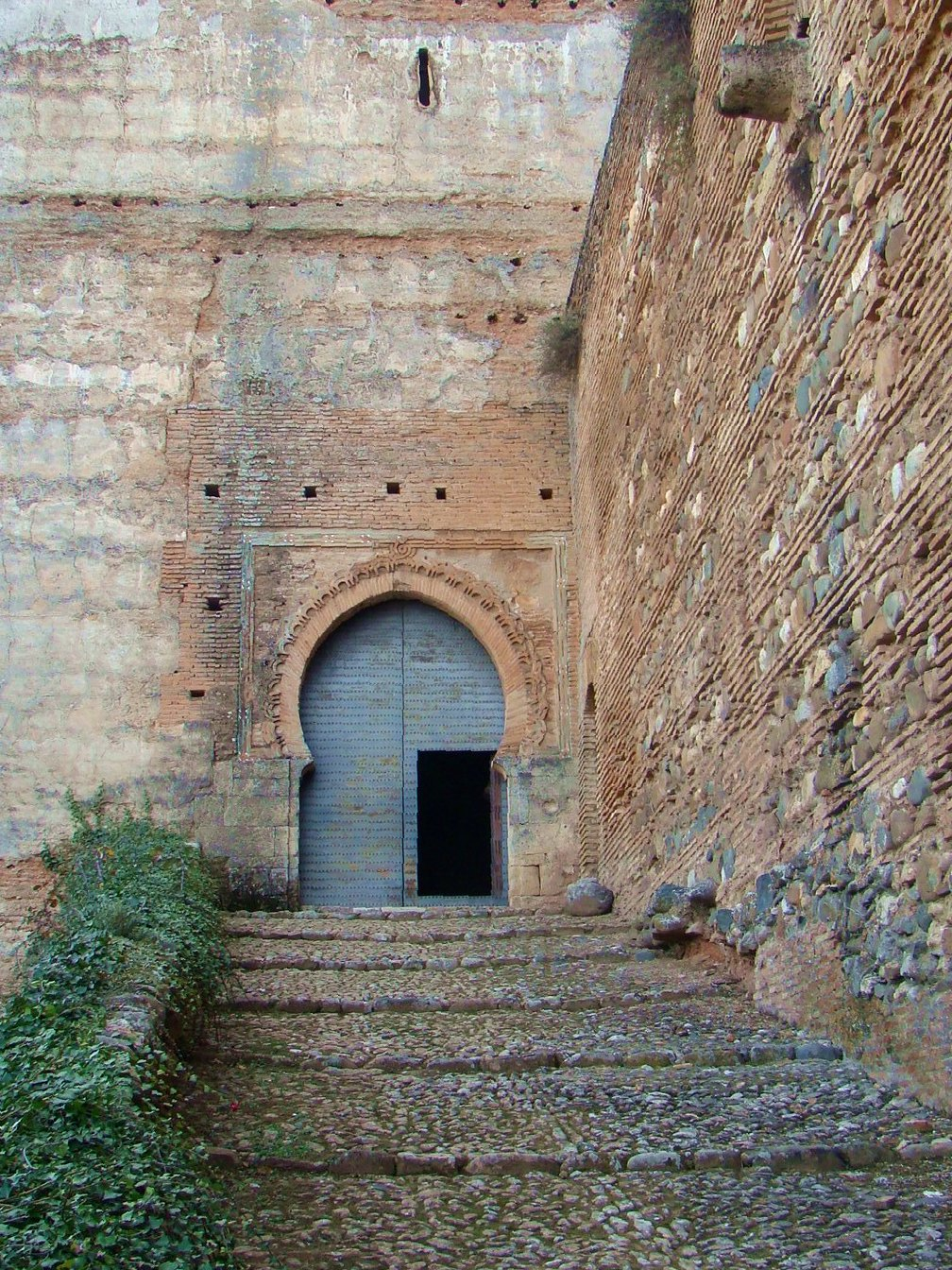
The Puerta de las Armas ('Gate of Arms'), the main northern gate of the Alhambra, from the 13th century

The other main gate of the Alhambra was the Puerta de las Armas ('Gate of Arms'), located on the north side of the Alcazaba, from which a walled ramp leads towards the Plaza de los Aljibes and the Nasrid Palaces. This was originally the main access point to the complex for the regular residents of the city, since it was accessible from the Albaicín side, but after the Christian conquest the Puerta de la Justicia was favoured by Ferdinand and Isabella. The gate, one of the earliest structures built in the Alhambra in the 13th century, is one of the Alhambra structures that bear the most resemblance to the Almohad architectural tradition that preceded the Nasrids. The exterior façade of the gate is decorated with a polylobed moulding with glazed tiles inside a rectangular alfiz frame. Inside the gate's passage is a dome that is painted to simulate the appearance of red brick, a decorative feature characteristic of the Nasrid period.

Two other exterior gates existed, both located further east. On the north side is the Puerta del Arrabal ('Arrabal Gate'), which opens onto the Cuesta de los Chinos ('Slope of the Pebbles'), the ravine between the Alhambra and the Generalife. It was probably created under Muhammad II and served the first palaces of the Alhambra which were built in this area during his reign. It underwent numerous modifications in the later Christian era of the Alhambra. On the south side is the Puerta de los Siete Suelos ('Gate of Seven Floors'), which was almost entirely destroyed by the explosions set off by the departing French troops in 1812. The present gate was reconstructed in the 1970s with help of remaining fragments and of multiple old engravings that illustrate the former gate. The original gate was probably built in the mid-14th century and its original Arabic name was Bab al-Gudur. It would have been the main entrance serving the medina, the area occupied by industries and the houses of workers inside the Alhambra. It was also through here that the Catholic Monarchs first entered the Alhambra on 2 January 1492.

=== Alcazaba ===
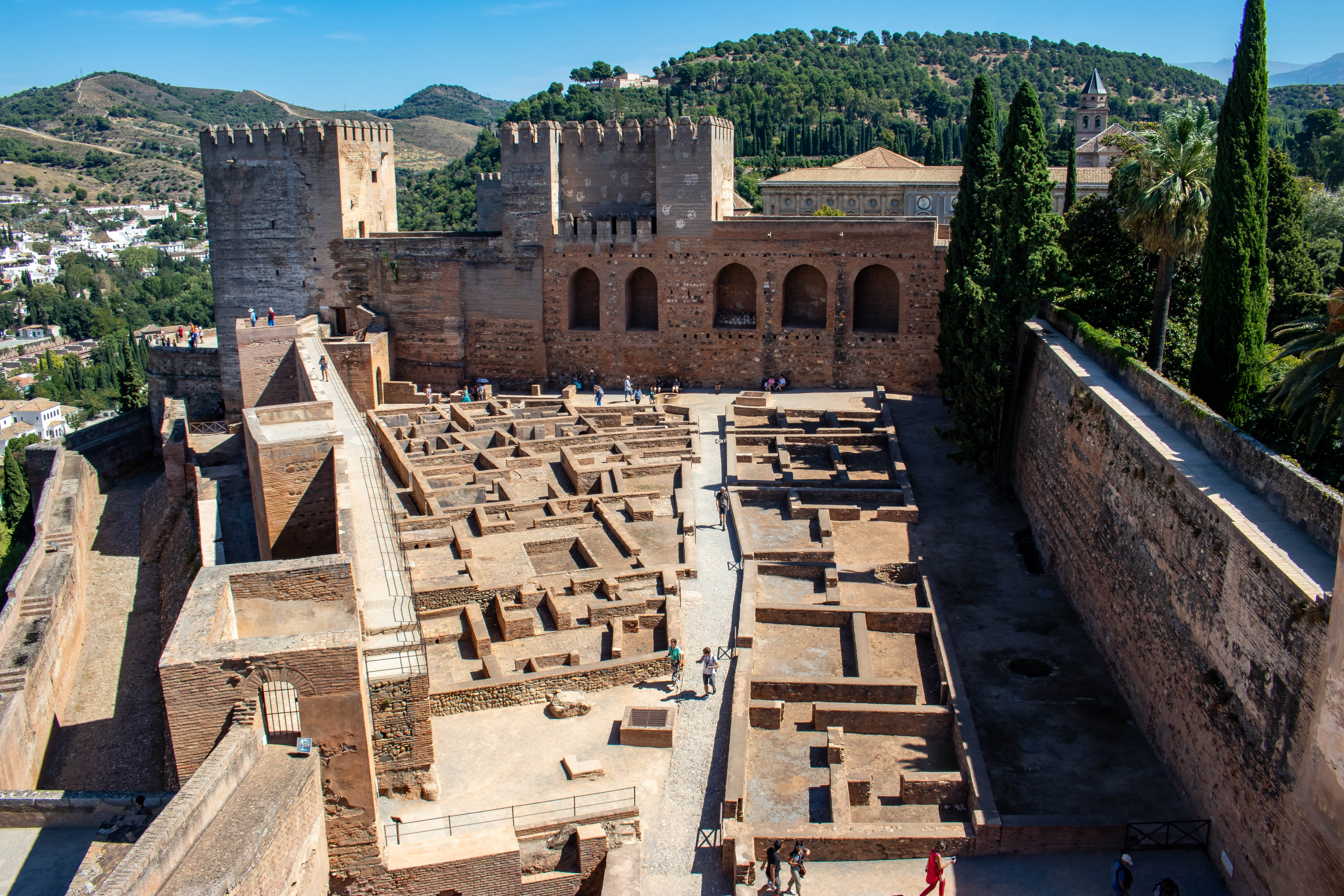
View of the Alcazaba and its interior

The Alcazaba or citadel is the oldest part of the Alhambra today. It was the centrepiece of the complicated system of fortifications that protected the area. Its tallest tower, the 26 m (85 ft) high Torre del Homenaje ('Tower of Homage'), was the keep and military command post of the complex. It may have also been the first residence of Ibn al-Ahmar inside the Alhambra while the complex was being constructed. The westernmost tower, the 25 m (82 ft) high Torre de la Vela, acted as a watch tower. The flag of Ferdinand and Isabella was first raised above it as a symbol of the Spanish conquest of Granada on 2 January 1492. A bell was added on the tower soon afterward and for centuries it was rung at regular times every day and on special occasions. In 1843 the tower became part of the city's coat of arms. Inside the enclosure of the inner fortress was a residential district that housed the elite guards of the Alhambra. It contained urban amenities like a communal kitchen, a hammam, and a water supply cistern, as well as multiple subterranean chambers which served as dungeons and silos.

=== Nasrid palaces ===
The royal palace complex consists of three main parts, from west to east: the Mexuar, the Comares Palace, and the Palace of the Lions. (Note: Some scholarly descriptions of the palaces treat the Mexuar as merely one part of the larger Comares Palace.) Collectively, these palaces are also known as the Casa Real Vieja ('Old Royal Palace'), to distinguish them from the newer palaces erected next to them during the Christian Spanish period.

==== Mexuar ====
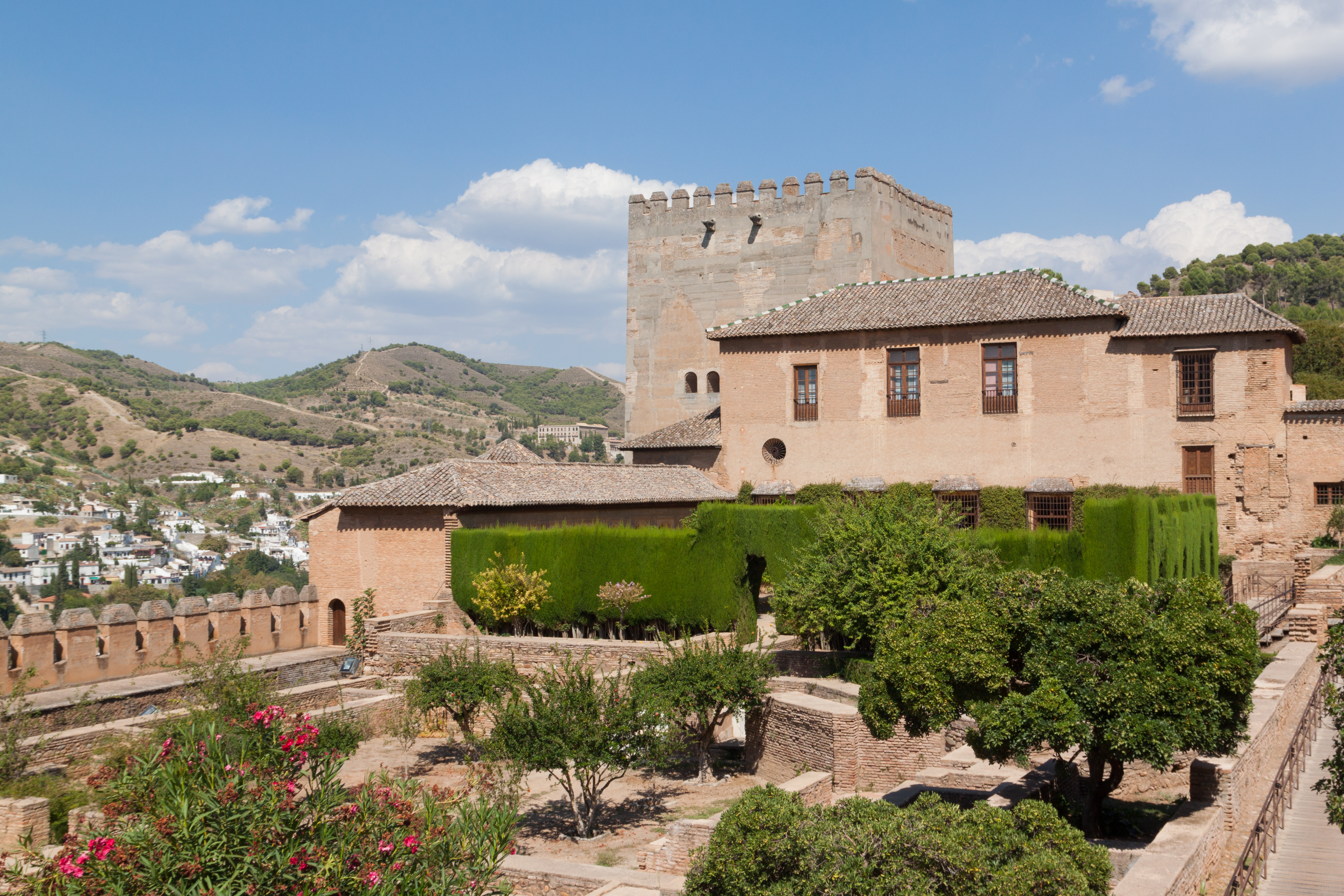
View of the Mexuar today (with the Comares Tower also visible behind it)

The Mexuar is the westernmost part of the palace complex. It was analogous to the mashwars (or mechouars) of royal palaces in North Africa. It was first built as part of the larger complex begun by Isma'il I which included the Comares Palace. It housed many of the administrative and more public functions of the palace, such as the chancery and the treasury. Its layout consisted of two consecutive courtyards followed by a main hall, all aligned along a central axis from west to east. Little remains of the two western courtyards of the Mexuar today, except for their foundations, a portico, and the water basin of a fountain. The main hall, known as the Sala del Mexuar or Council Hall, served as a throne hall where the sultan received and judged petitions. This area also granted access to the Comares Palace via the Cuarto Dorado section on the east side of the Council Hall. Multiple parts of the Mexuar were significantly modified in the post-Reconquista period; notably, the Sala del Mexuar was converted into a Christian chapel and additions were made to the Cuarto Dorado to convert it into a residence. Many of these additions were later removed during modern restorations in the 19th and 20th centuries.

==== Comares Palace ====
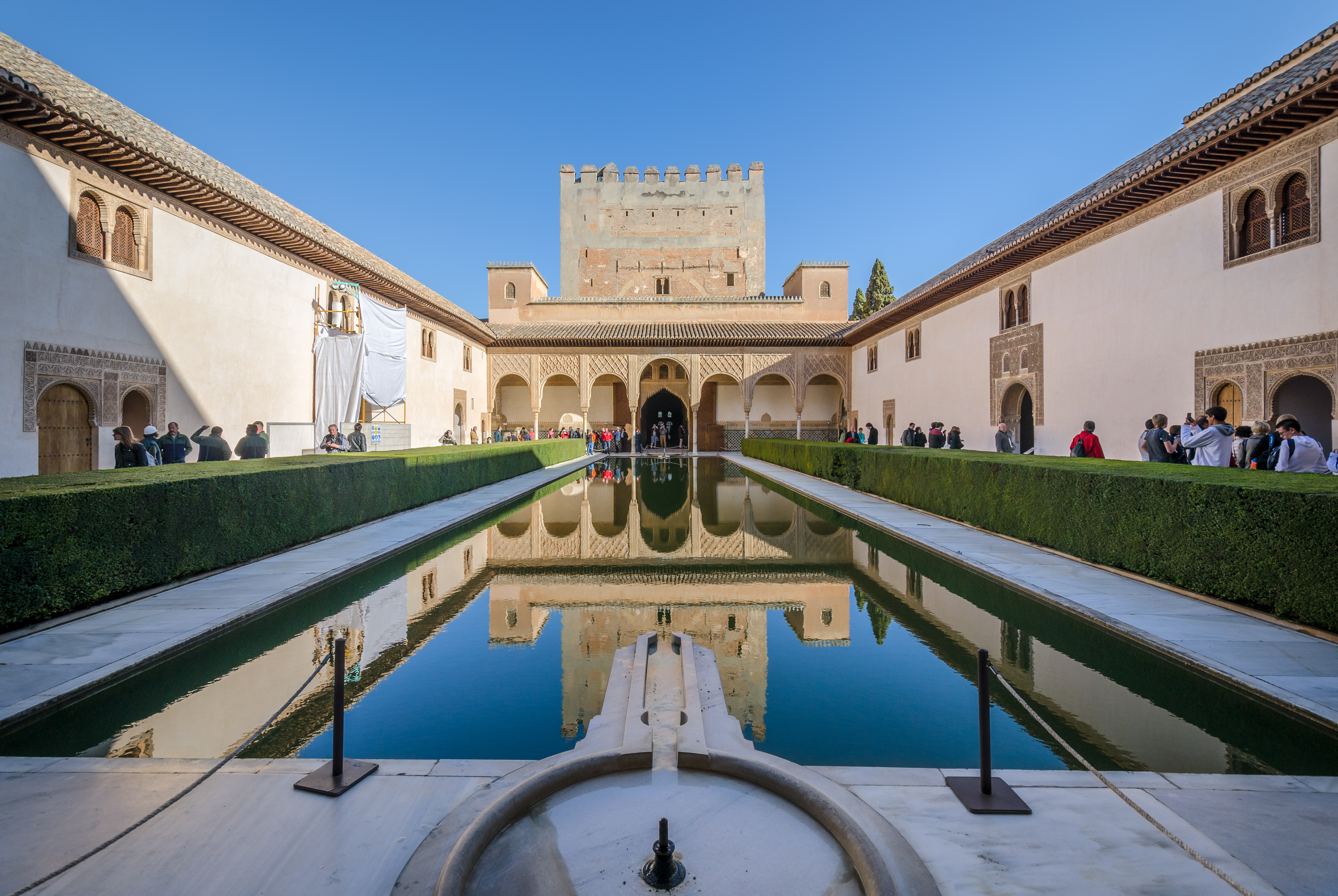
The Court of the Myrtles, the central courtyard of the Comares Palace

The Comares Palace was the core of a large palace complex begun by Isma'il I in the early 13th century and subsequently modified and refurbished by Yusuf I and Muhammad V over the course of the same century. This new palace complex served as the official palace of the sultan and the state, known in Arabic as the Qaṣr al-Sultan or Dār al-Mulk. The Comares Palace was accessed from the west through the Mexuar. An internal façade, known as the Comares Façade, stands on the south side of the Patio de Cuarto Dorado ('Courtyard of the Gilded Room') at the east edge of the Mexuar. This highly decorated symmetrical façade, with two doors, was the entrance to the palace and likely served in some ceremonial functions.

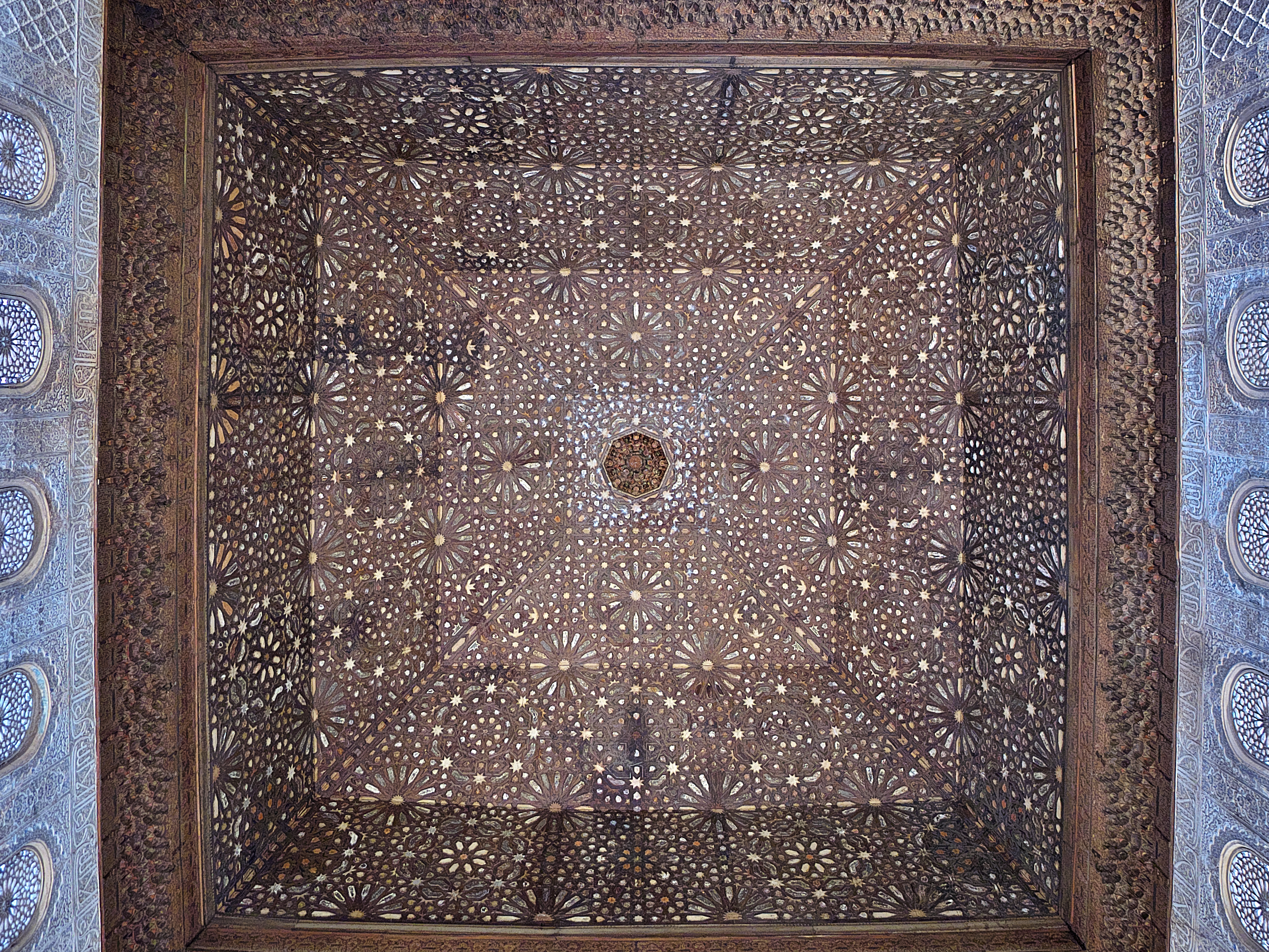
Ceiling of the Hall of the Ambassadors

The Comares Palace itself is centred around the Patio de los Arrayanes ('Court of the Myrtles'), a courtyard measuring 23 to 23.5 metres wide and 36.6 metres long, with its long axis aligned roughly north-to-south. At the middle, aligned with the main axis of the court, is a wide reflective pool. The pool measures 34 metres long and 7,10 metres wide. The myrtle bushes that are the court's namesake grow in hedges along either side of this pool. Two ornate porticos are situated at the north and south ends of the court, leading to further halls and rooms behind them. The court's decoration contained eleven qasā'id by Ibn Zamrak, eight of which remain. Annexed to the east side of the palace are the Comares Baths, a royal hammam that is exceptionally well-preserved.

On the north side of the Court of the Myrtles, inside the massive Comares Tower, is the Salón de los Embajadores ('Hall of the Ambassadors'), the largest room in the Alhambra. It is accessed by passing through the Sala de la Barca, (Note: The name barca is assumed to derive from the Arabic word baraka, meaning "blessing", which is included in the inscriptions around the hall.) a wide rectangular hall behind the northern portico of the court. The Hall of the Ambassadors is a square chamber measuring 11.3 metres per side and rising to a height of 18.2 metres. This was the throne room or audience chamber of the sultan. The sultan's throne was placed opposite the entrance in front of a recessed double-arched window at the back of the hall. In addition to the extensive tile and stucco decoration of the walls, the interior culminates in a large domed ceiling. The ceiling is made of 8017 interlinked pieces of wood that form an abstract geometric representation of the seven heavens. The hall and its tower project from the walls of the palace, with windows providing views in three directions. In this sense, it was an enlarged version of a mirador, a room from which the palace's inhabitants could gaze outward to the surrounding landscape.

==== Palace of the Lions ====
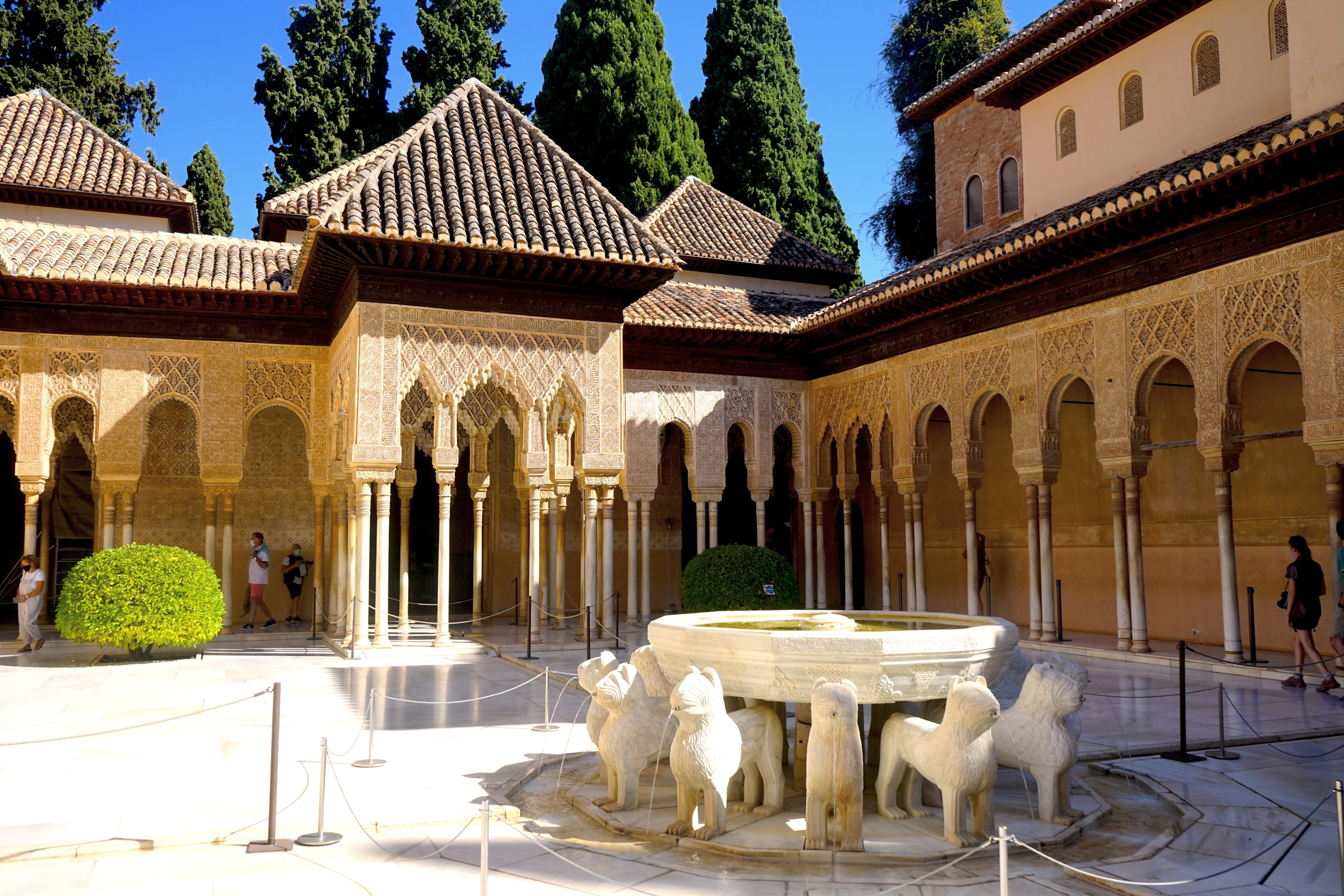
The Court of the Lions and its central fountain

The Palace of the Lions is one of the most famous palaces in Islamic architecture and exemplifies the apogee of Nasrid architecture under the reign of Muhammad V. Its central rectangular courtyard measures about 28.7 metres long and 15.6 metres wide, with its long axis aligned roughly east-to-west. The arches and columns of the surrounding portico are arranged in a complex pattern of single columns alternating with groups of two or three columns, a design that was unique in Islamic architecture. Two ornate pavilions stand at the east and west sides of the courtyard, while the centre is occupied by the famed Fountain of the Lions. The fountain consists of a large basin surrounded by twelve stylized lion sculptures, all carved from marble. Along the rim of the fountain's basin is an inscribed poem composed by Ibn Zamrak. This praises the beauty of the fountain and the power of the lions, but it also describes their hydraulic systems and how they worked.

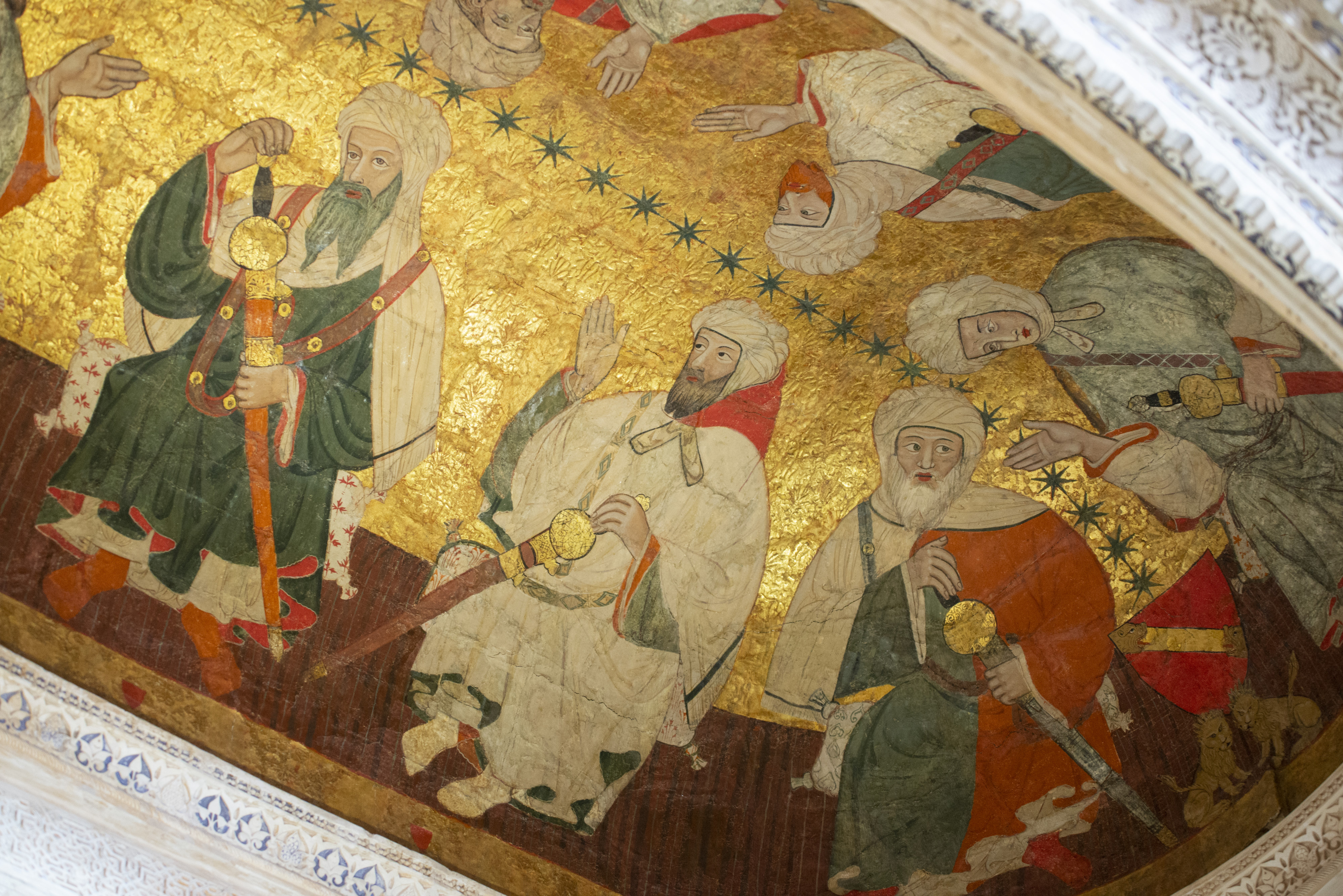
Painted ceiling with Nasrid figures in the Hall of Kings

Four halls are arranged around the courtyard. The Sala de los Mocárabes ('Hall of the mocárabes (muqarnas)'), on the west side, was damaged in 1590 by the explosion of a nearby gunpowder magazine and its ceiling was replaced by the current Baroque-style plaster vault in 1714. The Sala de los Reyes ('Hall of Kings'), on the east side, is subdivided into multiple sections covered by muqarnas vaults. Opening behind these are several more rooms, three of which contain rounded vault ceilings covered by unique pictorial scenes painted on leather. One painting shows ten figures, probably sultans or other important dignitaries, sitting and discussing together. The two other paintings feature scenes of sports, hunting, and court life. The style of painting was influenced to one extent or another by Christian Gothic art.

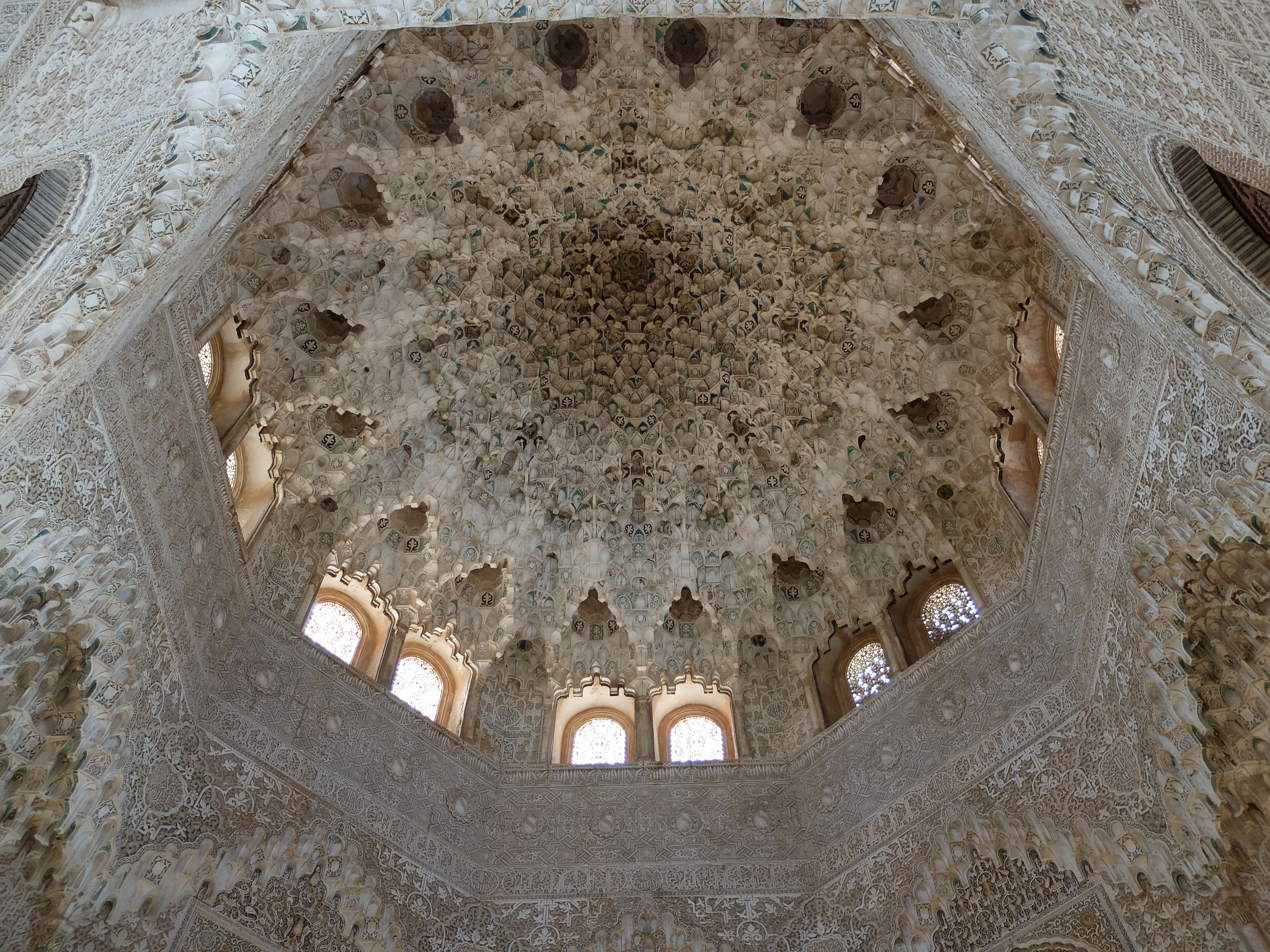
Muqarnas dome in the Hall of the Two Sisters

On the south side of the courtyard, the Sala de los Abencerrajes ('Hall of the Abencerrages') derives its name from a legend according to which the father of Boabdil, the last sultan of Granada, having invited the chiefs of that line to a banquet, massacred them here. It is covered by an elaborate muqarnas vault ceiling, featuring a 16-sided lantern cupola in the shape of an eight-pointed star, possibly symbolizing the celestial heaven. On the north side of the courtyard is the Sala de Dos Hermanas ('Hall of Two Sisters'), so-called because of two large slabs of marble that form part of the pavement. Its original Arabic name was al-Qubba al-Kubrā (Arabic: القبة الكبرى, lit. 'the Great Dome'), suggesting it had a particular significance. The hall is covered by one of the most remarkable muqarnas domes in Islamic art. The muqarnas composition consists of at least 5000 prismatic pieces, unfolding from the central summit into sixteen miniature domes right above the level of the windows.

To the north of the Sala de Dos Hermanas, and accessed through it, is the Mirador de Lindaraja, a small projecting room with double-arched windows on three sides which overlook the gardens below. The name Lindaraja is a corruption of Arabic 'Ayn Dar 'Aisha (Arabic: عين دار عائشة, lit. 'Eye of the House of 'Aisha'). This small chamber has some of the most sophisticated carved stucco decoration in the Alhambra and retains original mosaic tilework that features very fine Arabic inscriptions. The room is also covered by a unique vault ceiling consisting of a wooden lattice shaped into an interlacing geometric motif and filled with pieces of coloured glass.

==== Renaissance apartments and courtyards ====
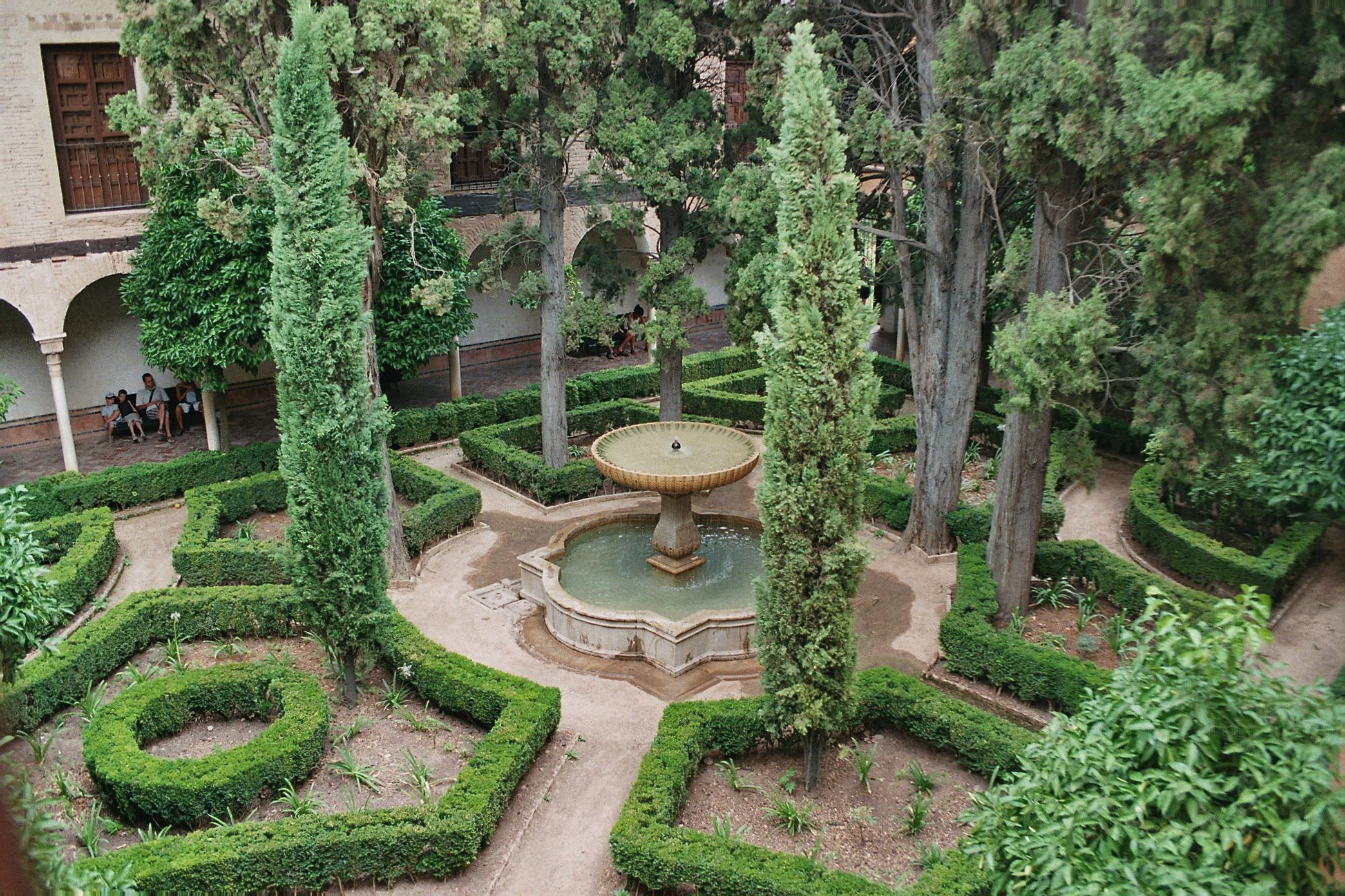
The Lindaraja Courtyard, constructed in the 16th century

To the east of the Comares Palace and the Palace of the Lions is an area of Renaissance-style Christian additions dating primarily from the 16th century. Directly north of the Palace of the Lions is the Patio de Lindaraja (Lindaraja Courtyard), originally an open garden area but turned into a cloistered garden by the addition of new structures around it during the 16th century. The fountain at its centre features a Baroque pedestal made in 1626 that supports a Nasrid marble basin installed here at the same time, although a replica now replaces the original basin which is kept at the Alhambra Museum. On the west and north sides of the courtyard, along the upper floors, are six rooms constructed for Charles V between 1528 and 1537, known as the Emperor's Chambers. The most interesting details of the rooms are a marble fireplace sculpted with the emperor's coat of arms and a ceiling of panels painted with pictures of fruits. The paintings were made around 1537 by Julio Aquiles and Alejandro Mayner. To the west of the Lindaraja Courtyard is the smaller Patio de la Reja ('Courtyard of the Queen'), located between the Emperor's Chambers and the Comares Tower. A gallery was built around the upper floor of the courtyard between 1654 and 1655.

Further north is a tower known as the Peinador de la Reina ('Queen's Robing Room'), formerly known as the Tower of Abu al-Juyyush. This was originally a stand-alone fortification tower in the Alhambra walls that was probably built in the reign of Nasr (r. 1309–1314), also known as Abu al-Juyyush. Yusuf I converted it into a small palatial residence with a lantern ceiling and Muhammad V later added decoration around its entrance. Between 1528 and 1537 it was connected to the Emperor's Chambers via a new elevated gallery and an upper level was added to the tower around the existing lantern ceiling. Between 1539 and 1546 this upper floor was painted by Julio Aquiles and Alejandro Mayner with mythological scenes, depictions of Charles V's 1535 invasion of Tunis, and more formal classical-like motifs. Later, in 1618, Nasrid-period columns and capitals from other palaces were integrated into the gallery, some of which were later moved to the Alhambra Museum.

==== Partal Palace and gardens ====
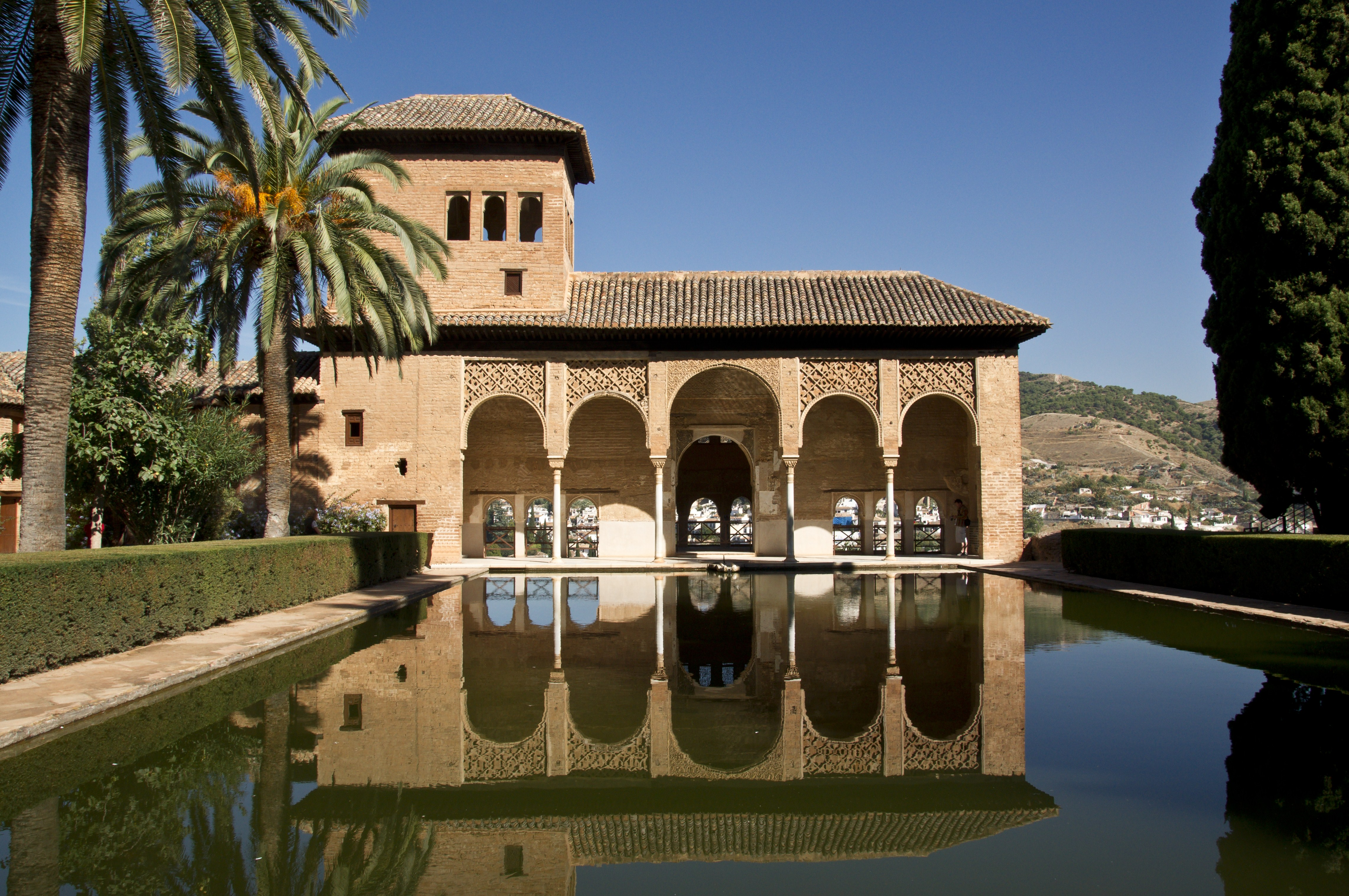
The Partal Palace

To the east of the Palace of the Lions and the Renaissance additions is the Partal Palace, a pavilion structure on the edge of the Alhambra walls. It was built by Muhammad III, which makes it the oldest surviving palace in the Alhambra today, although it has undergone many alterations since then. Its south side has a portico and faces a large reflective pool, while a mirador projects from its north side over the walls. Next to it is a small but richly decorated oratory containing a mihrab. Beyond the Partal is an area of gardens stretching along the northern wall of the Alhambra. Several towers along this northern wall were converted into small palatial residences during the Nasrid period, including the Torre de los Picos ("Tower of the Pointed Battlements"), the Torre de la Cautiva ("Tower of the Captive"), and the Torre de las Infantas ("Tower of the Princesses"). For tourists visiting the Alhambra today, all these areas are accessible after passing through the main Nasrid Palaces, although the palace-towers are not normally open to visitors.

=== Palace of Charles V ===
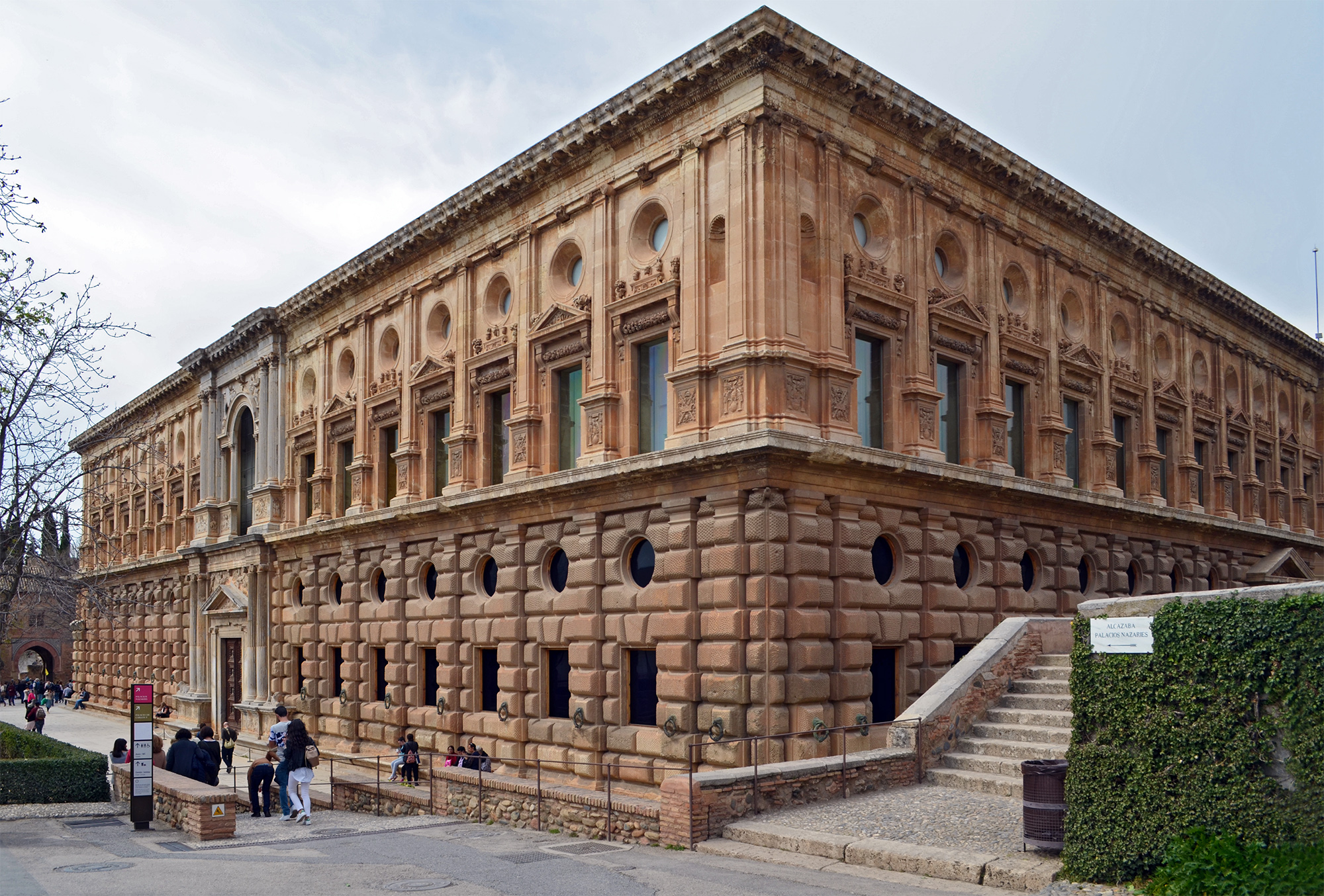
Exterior of the Palace of Charles V

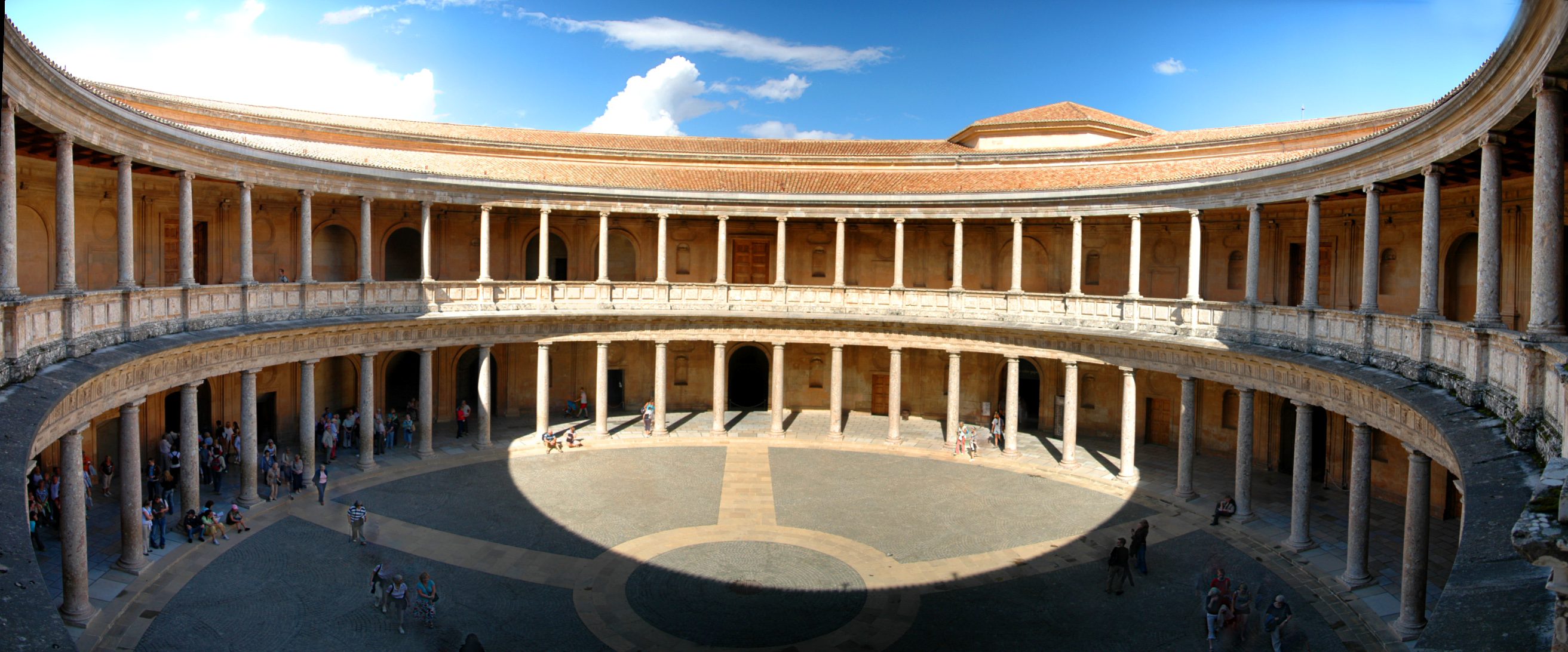
Courtyard of the Palace of Charles V

The palace commissioned by Charles V in the middle of the Alhambra was designed by Pedro Machuca, an architect who had trained under Michelangelo in Rome and who was steeped in the culture of the Italian High Renaissance and of the artistic circles of Raphael and Giulio Romano. It was conceived in a contemporary Renaissance style or "Roman" style with an innovative design reflecting the architectural ideals of this period. The construction of a monumental Italian-influenced palace in the heart of the Nasrid-built Alhambra symbolized Charles V's imperial status and the triumph of Christianity over Islam achieved by his grandparents (the Catholic Monarchs). It consists of a massive square structure of stone which encloses a perfectly circular courtyard. The exterior facades are divided into two horizontal zones of decoration, with rustication below and pilasters alternating with other embellishments above. The two main entrance portals, on the western and southern sides, have designs resembling triumphal arches with engaged columns. The pedestals of these columns are carved with reliefs depicting allegorical scenes such as the Victories destroying armaments, representing the emperor's imposition of a universal peace. The upper façade of the southern entrance portal features a Serlian window. Among the other details of the palace façades are a series of bronze rings or knockers which are strictly ornamental, with more Hispanic symbolic imagery such as lion and eagle heads. Pedro Machuca had intended to create plazas with colonnades on the east and west sides of the building to serve as a grand new approach to the Alhambra palaces, but these were never executed.

Construction of the palace began in 1527. After Machuca's death in 1550, it was continued by his son Luis, who finished the facades and built the internal courtyard. Work was halted for 15 years when the 1568 Morisco Rebellion began. Work was still unfinished when Philip IV visited in 1628 and the project was finally abandoned in 1637, leaving the structure without a roof. It was finally completed after 1923, when Leopoldo Torres Balbás began its restoration. Today, the building houses the Alhambra Museum, which holds objects and artefacts relating to the Alhambra's history, as well as the Fine Arts Museum of Granada, which houses a collection of paintings from Granada dating from the 16th to 20th centuries.

=== Other Nasrid palaces ===
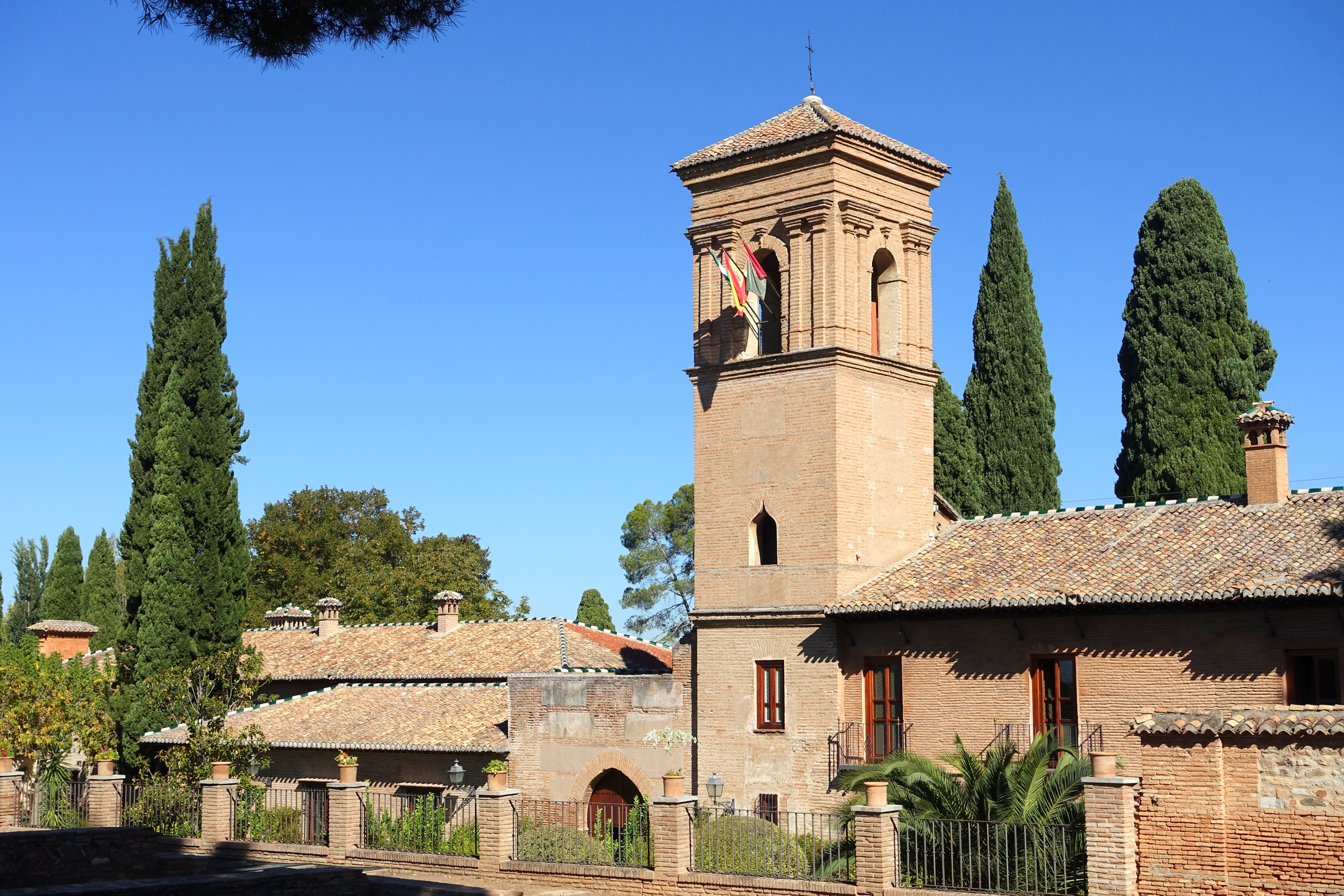
The Convent of Saint Francis was built over the remains of a former Nasrid palace. The building is now a Parador (state-owned hotel).

Three other major Nasrid-era palaces once existed but were largely destroyed over the centuries. The excavated remains of the Palacio del Partal Alto ("Upper Partal Palace"), also known as the Palacio del Conde del Tendilla ("Palace of the Count of Tendilla'"), are incorporated today into the Partal Gardens. The palace dates from the time of Muhammad II, with later renovations and modifications, and is the oldest palace in the Alhambra of which traces have been found.

The Palace of the Convent of San Francisco (Palacio del Convento de San Francisco, also known as the Palacio de los Infantes) is named after the Convent of Saint Francis which was installed here in 1494. The Nasrid palace here was probably first built by Muhammad II but some surviving inscriptions suggest it was significantly remodelled by Muhammad V. Little remains of the Nasrid structure today except for a rectangular courtyard and some of its adjoining rooms, including a richly decorated chamber with muqarnas vaulting. Queen Isabella I was originally buried here in 1504 before her body was moved to the Royal Chapel near the cathedral. The rest of the present-day building dates from an 18th-century remodelling of the convent and includes a cloistered courtyard. Today it serves as a Parador (state-owned hotel).

The Palace of the Abencerrajes (Palacio de los Abencerrajes) was one of the largest palaces in the Alhambra and may also date from the time of Muhammad II. What was left of the palace was blown up by Napoleon's troops in 1812. It then became part of an area of abandoned ruins known as the Secano. Its excavated remains are visible today in the southern part of the complex but they have yet to be fully studied.

=== Church of Santa Maria and the Alhambra Mosque ===
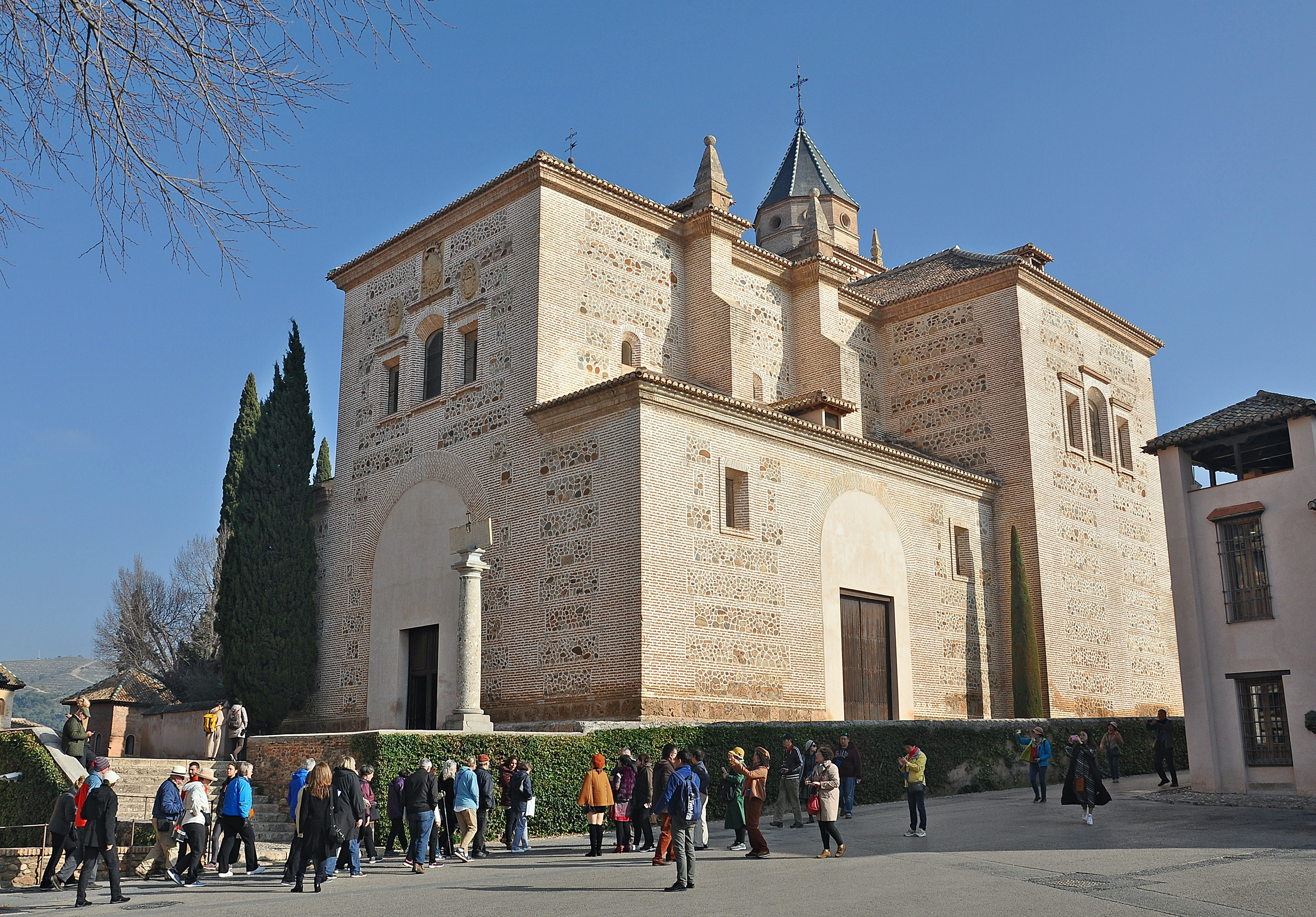
Exterior of the Church of Santa Maria de la Alhambra

Located just east of the Palace of Charles V is the Catholic Church of Santa María de la Alhambra ('Saint Mary of the Alhambra'), which stands on the site of the former Alhambra Mosque, the congregational mosque of the Alhambra complex. The church was built between 1581 and 1618. It is under the authority of the Archbishop of Granada. The building was designed by architects Juan de Herrera and Juan de Orea and completed by Ambrosio Vico. Inside is a large Baroque altarpiece with gilded ornate columns completed in 1671, although the most impressive centrepiece of the altar, a sculpture of Our Lady of Sorrows (depicting Mary holding the body of Jesus), was carved between 1750 and 1760 by Torcuato Ruiz del Peral. Every year during Holy Week, this sculpture is taken out and carried in a procession through the streets of Granada. During processions it is carried on top of a "throne" or platform that is sculpted to resemble the arcades in the Court of the Lions.

Little remains of the Alhambra Mosque which stood previously on this site, aside from an ornate bronze lamp now preserved at the National Archaeological Museum in Madrid. According to an inscription on this lamp and to the writings of Ibn al-Khatib, the mosque was commissioned by Muhammad III and completed in 1305. The mosque's main axis was aligned towards the qibla to the southeast, which also matched the alignment of the main street next to it. The structure consisted of a hypostyle hall with three "naves" separated by rows of three arches. The arches were supported by marble columns with capitals similar in style to those of the earlier Cordoban Caliphate period in the 10th century. The roof was made of wood and the central nave, which led to the mihrab, had a higher ceiling than the two side naves. A slender minaret stood at the western end of the building. After the Christian conquest, the building was converted to a church but by the late 16th century it was in disrepair. It was finally demolished in 1576, prior to the construction of the present church.

==== Baths of the mosque ====
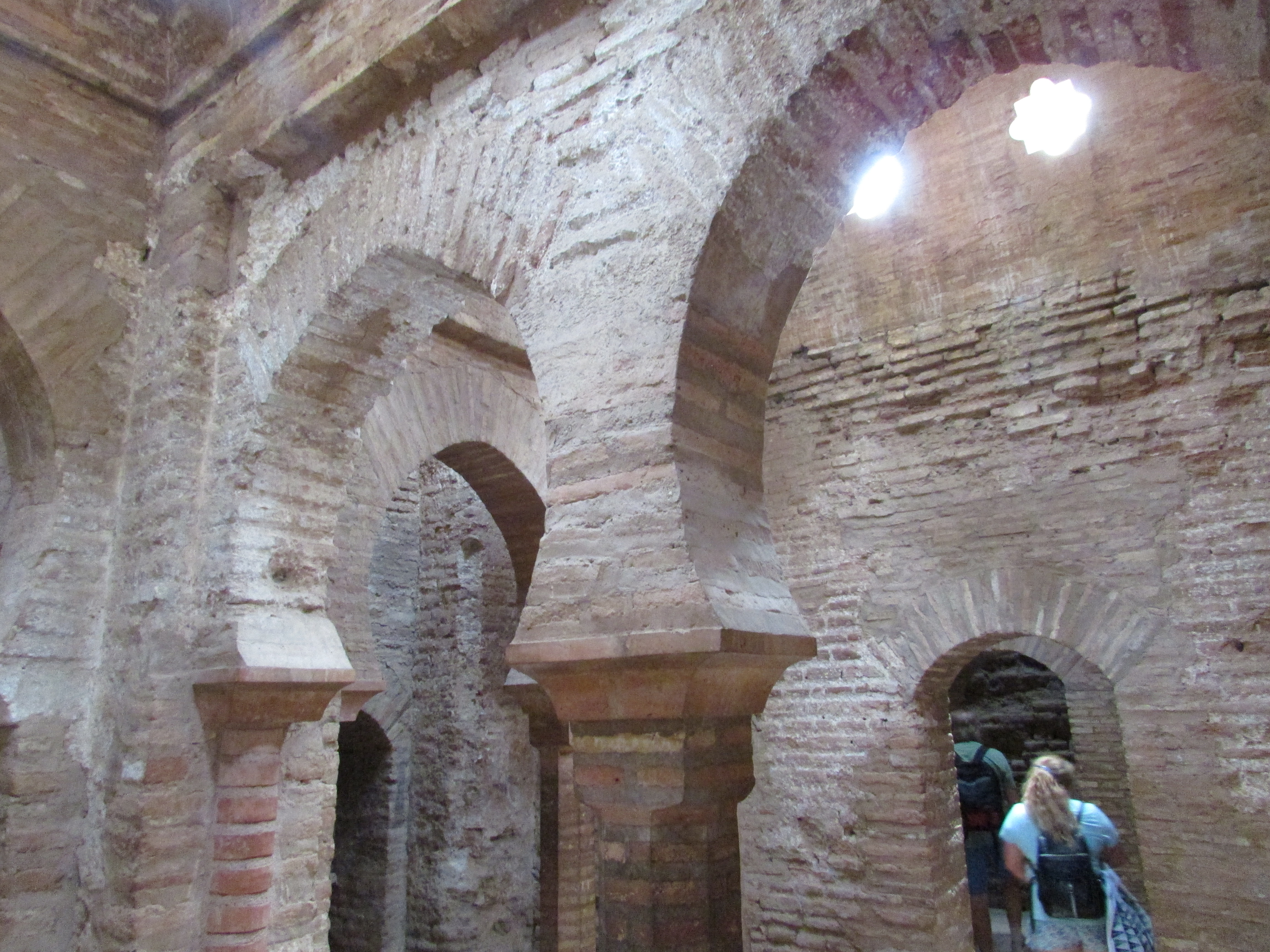
Interior of the baths (hammam) that stood near the Alhambra Mosque

One of the Alhambra Mosque's annexes, the baths (hammam), has been preserved on the east side of the church today and is accessible from the main street. Like other Islamic baths, it provided general hygiene to the local residents as well as the means to perform the ritual ablutions (ghusl) for religious purposes. Although sometimes eroticized in Romantic western literature, visitors attended the baths strictly with members of the same sex and wore cloths or towels around their private parts. These baths were constructed under Muhammad III along with the mosque. They may have been partly demolished in 1534 before being incorporated into a residential house during the 17th and 18th centuries. The preserved remains were significant enough to enable their restoration and reconstruction in 1934.

The layout of the baths had a typical sequence of rooms, including a changing room (bayt al-maslak͟h in Arabic), a cold room (bayt al-barid), and a hot room (bayt al-sak͟hun). Behind the hot room there would have been a boiler room where water was heated and firewood stored nearby. Original fragments of tile and stucco decoration, as well as part of the marble flooring, have been preserved in some of the rooms. The hot room has one small pool and another may have existed where a modern fountain stands today. However, unlike in Christian and earlier Greco-Roman culture, Muslims generally did not favour swimming or immersion in water for their visits to the baths. Private baths, of varying size and importance, were also built as part of the Alhambra's palaces.

=== Rawda (Nasrid mausoleum) ===
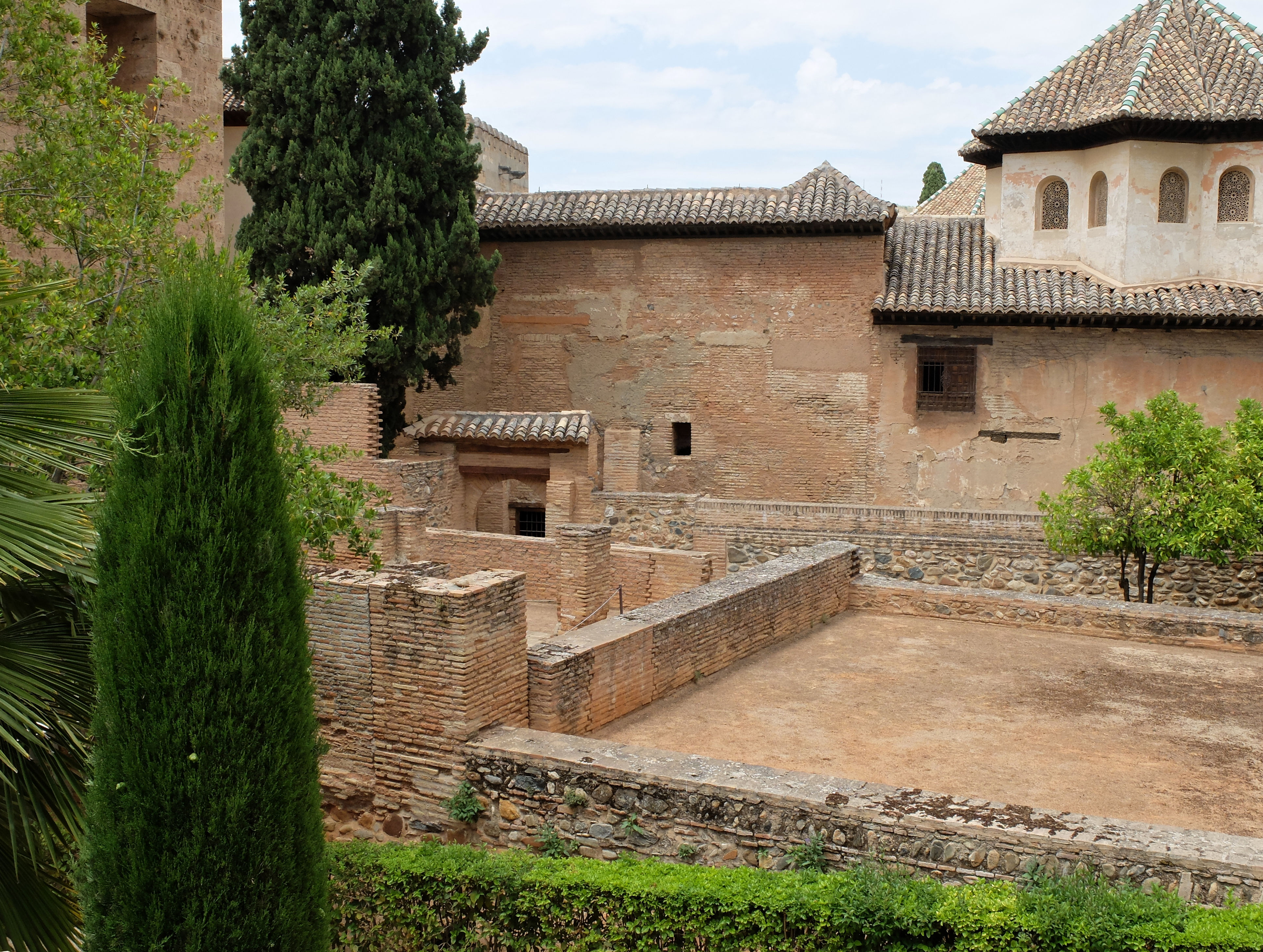
Remains of the Rawda mausoleum today (with the Palace of the Lions standing behind it)

In the space between the former mosque and the Palace of the Lions stood the Rawda (spelled Rauda in Spanish), the royal mausoleum of the Nasrids. The term rawda (Arabic: الروضة) means 'garden' in Arabic, but a number of historic Islamic necropolises or cemeteries were known by this name, including the necropolis of the former Umayyad rulers in Cordoba. The Nasrid mausoleum was first built by Isma'il I in the early 14th century, though an earlier cemetery may have already existed there previously. The structure no longer stands today but it has been studied by archaeologists and its foundations are still visible. The necropolis consisted of a rectangular enclosure which was accessed through a small horseshoe-arch gate preserved today on its north side. Inside the enclosure was a square mausoleum chamber covered by a roof with a central square lantern. (The presence of the lantern is indicated by the remains of four pillars in the centre of the structure.) Some rectangular rooms were adjoined to the side of this chamber. The mausoleum was preceded by a rectangular courtyard. This layout was similar to some earlier mausoleums in North Africa and to the later Saadian Tombs in Marrakesh. Like the nearby mosque, the mausoleum was aligned with the qibla. It was decorated with carved stucco and tilework, remains of which have been uncovered in excavations. The windows of the central lantern were closed with wooden latticework, an example of which is preserved in the Alhambra Museum today.

The most important persons, such as the Nasrid rulers, were buried inside this mausoleum, but in the open space between the mausoleum and the outer enclosure wall were other graves belonging to less important figures. The tombs of important figures were covered with marble slabs on top of which were pyramidal or prismatic stones known as maqabriyyas, while lesser tombs outside where framed by stone curbs that made them look like miniature gardens. At the heads of important graves were marble tombstones carved with detailed inscriptions, some examples of which are preserved at the Alhambra Museum today. In 1574, during construction of the nearby Palace of Charles V, the tombstones of Muhammad II, Isma'il I, Yusuf I and Yusuf III were discovered. When Torres Balbás investigated the site in 1925–1926 he found 70 more graves inside the enclosure. Almost all the graves were already empty, as Muhammad XI, the last sultan of Granada, arranged to have the remains of his ancestors moved to an unknown site at Mondújar, in the Alpujarras.

=== Generalife ===
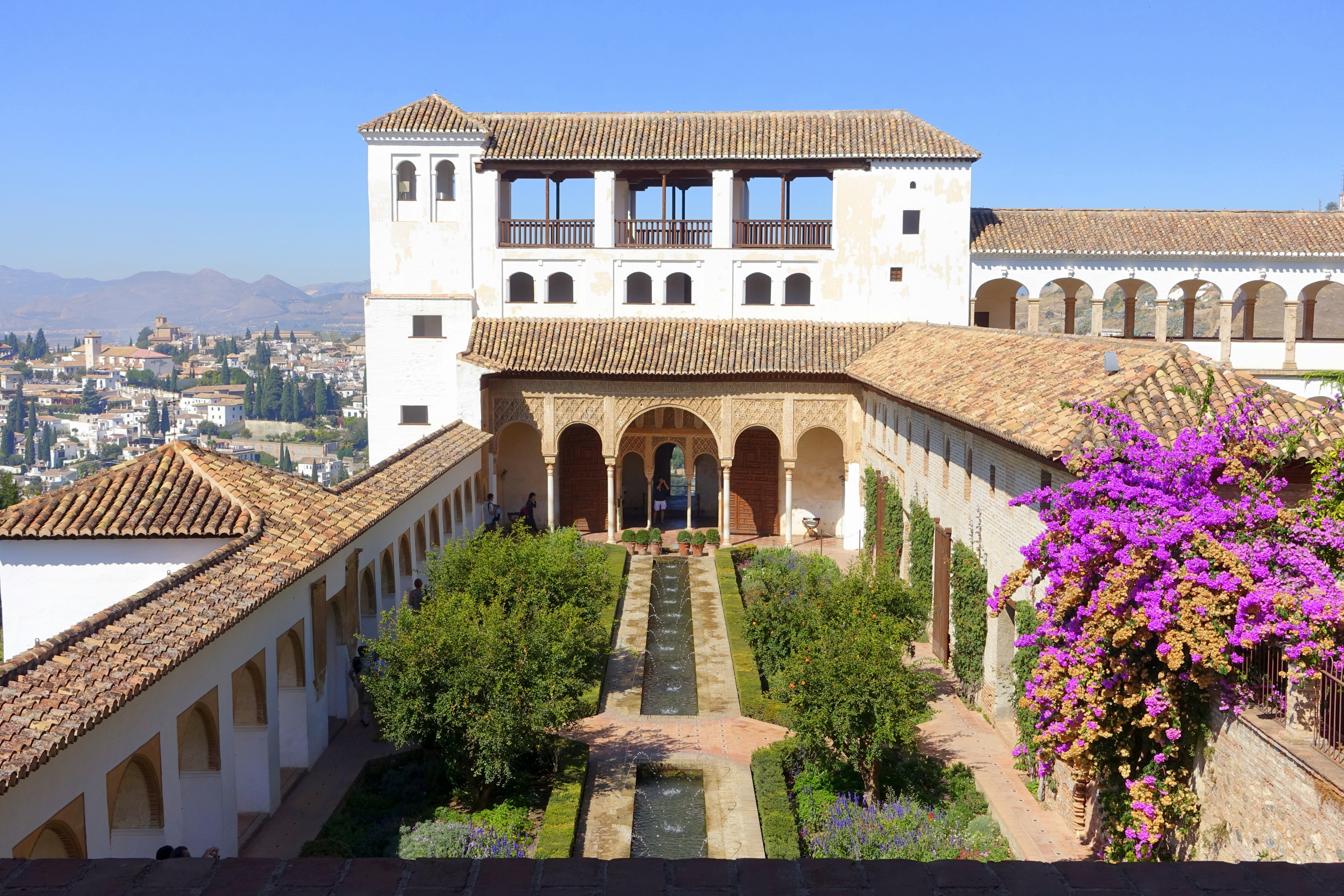
The Patio de la Acequia in the Generalife

To the east of the Alhambra and outside its walls is the Generalife (from Arabic: جَنَّة الْعَرِيف, romanized: Jannat al-'Ārifa), (Note: The exact meaning and etymology of the name is not known for certain.) a Nasrid-era country estate which was first built by Muhammad II and Muhammad III in the late 13th and early 14th centuries. It underwent multiple modifications under later Nasrid rulers and then by Christian Spanish builders in the 16th century. It features several rectangular garden courtyards with decorated pavilions at either end. A large area of landscaped gardens from the 20th century occupies the approach to the former palace today. The Nasrid palace was originally linked to the Alhambra by a walled corridor that crossed the valley between them.

=== Other outlying structures ===
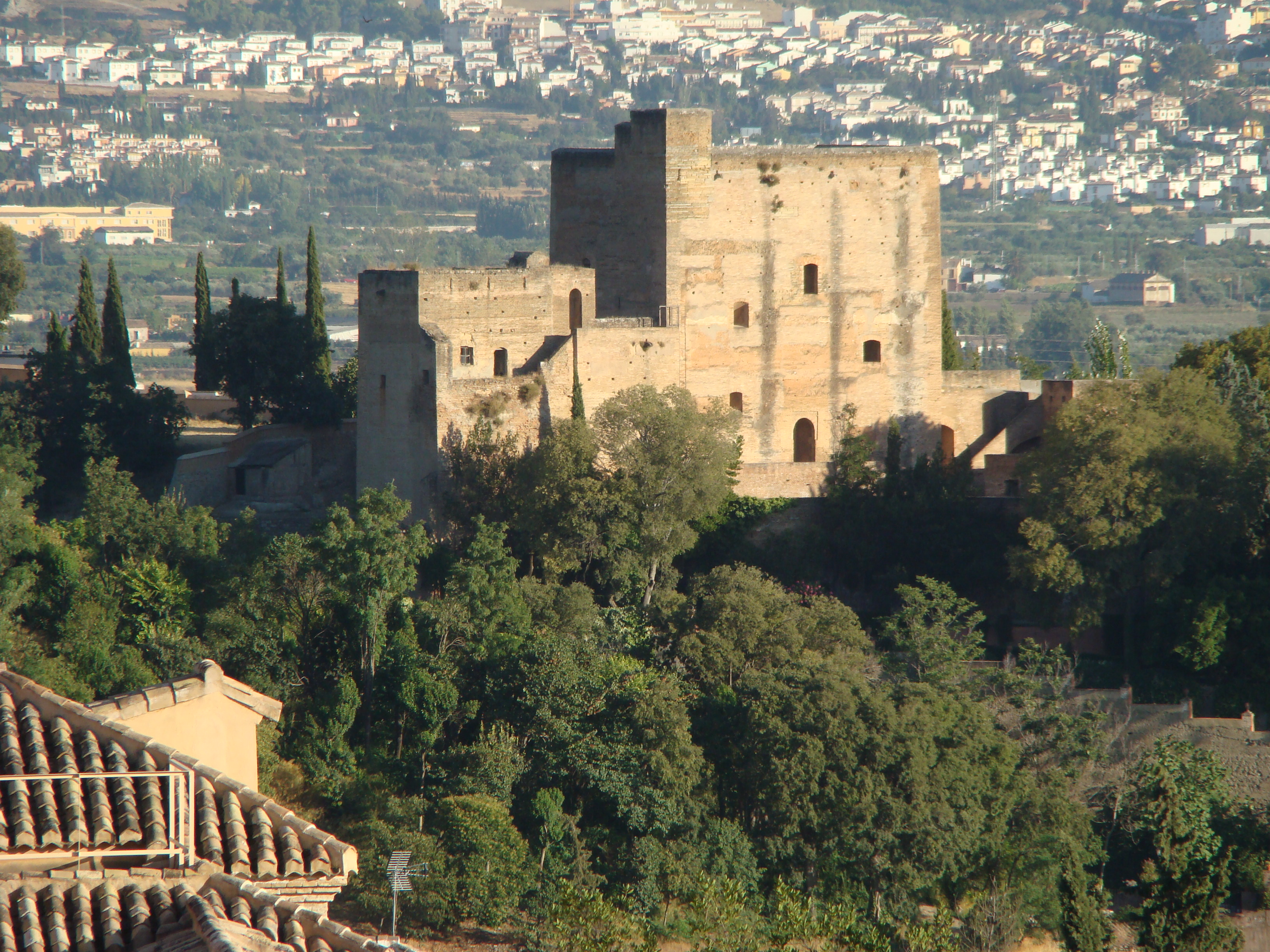
The Torres Bermejas on the Mauror Hill

The main approach to the Alhambra today is through the Alhambra Woods in the valley on its south side. The outer entrance to the woods is through the Puerta de las Granadas ('Gate of the Pomegranates'), a formal Renaissance-style gate built in 1536 over the remains of an earlier Islamic-era gate. Within the woods is the Puerta de Birambla (from Arabic Bab al-Ramla), one of the former Islamic-era gates in Granada's city walls which was demolished between 1873 and 1884 and then reconstructed here in 1933. To the south of the Puerta de las Granadas are the Torres Bermejas ('Vermilion Towers'), a group of three adjacent towers on the Mauror Hill. Their origin is not clear, but the oldest remains found here date from the late 8th century or early 9th century. They may have been inhabited by Muhammad I (the founder of the Nasrid dynasty). In the 16th century, during the Christian Spanish era, an artillery bastion was added to them on the northwest side.

During the Nasrid period there were several other country estates and palaces to the east of the Alhambra and the Generalife, located on the mountainside and taking advantage of the water supply system which ran through this area. The two best-known examples are the Palacio de los Alijares and the Dar al-'Arusa (Arabic: دار العروس, lit. 'House of the Bride'), both of which were built in the 14th century and then abandoned some time after the 1492 conquest. Only traces of them remain today. They were probably richly decorated like the Alhambra palaces and were accompanied by gardens and amenities like hammams. Also nearby is the Silla del Moro ('Seat of the Moor'), a ruined structure on the hilltop overlooking the Generalife. It was once a fort and monitoring post that protected the water supply infrastructure in this area.

== Water supply system ==
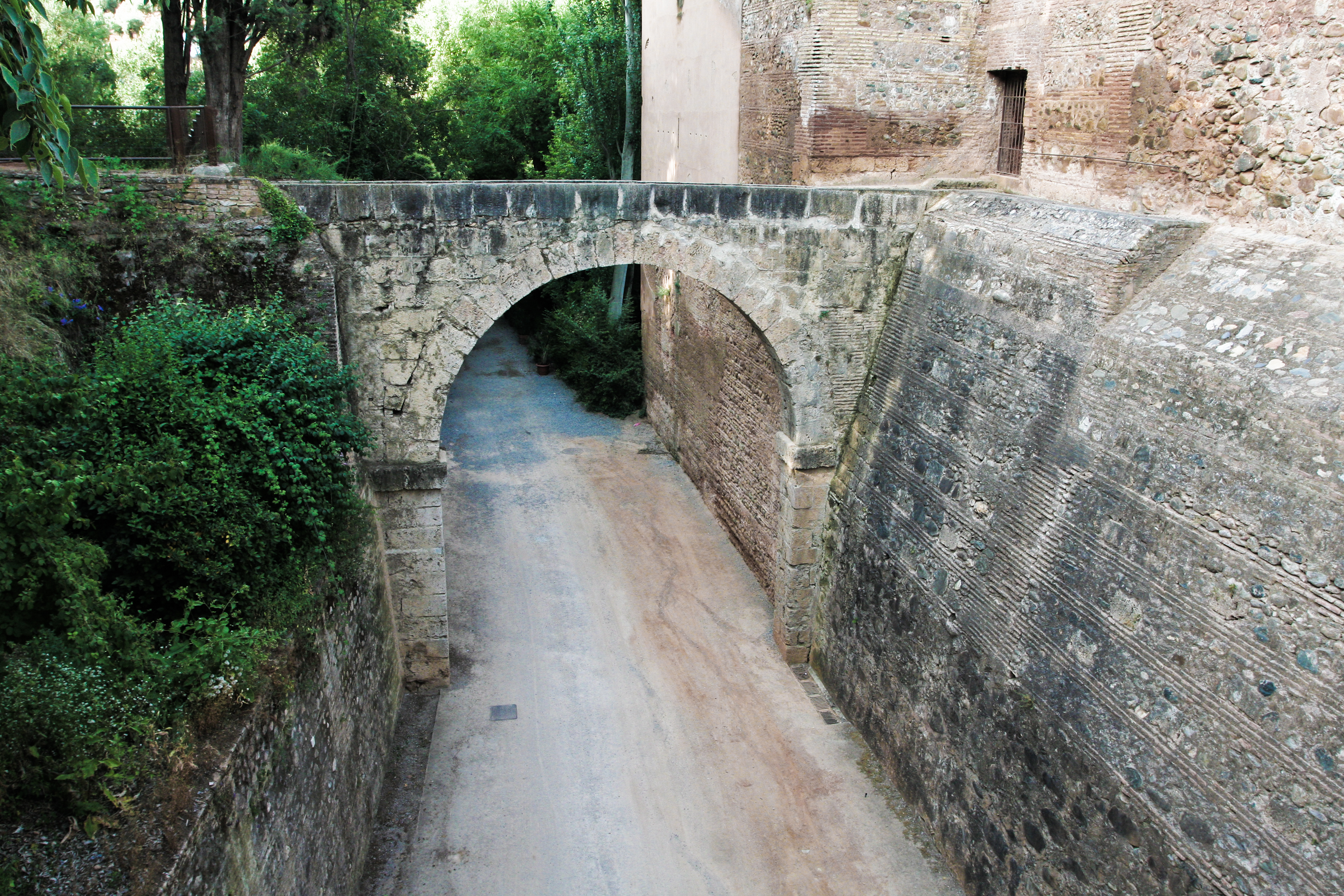
Aqueduct of the Acequia Real, which brings water into the Alhambra's walled enclosure (on the right)

Water was provided to both the Alhambra and the Generalife by the Acequia del Sultan (also known as the Acequia del Rey or Acequia Real), (Note: The canal was known as the Sāqiyat al-Sulṭān in Arabic (Arabic: ساقية السلطان, lit. 'canal of the sultan'; Spanish: Acequia del Sultan), but after the Nasrid period it became known in Spanish as the Acequia del Rey ('Canal of the King') or the Acequia Real ('Royal Canal').) which still exists in large part today. It draws water from the Darro River at an uphill location in the foothills of the Sierra Nevada, about 6.1 kilometres east of the Alhambra. A smaller branch known as the Acequia del Tercio also splits off from it several kilometres upstream and proceeded along higher ground before arriving at the top point of the Generalife's palace and gardens. The main branch, proceeding along lower ground, also arrives at the Generalife palace and supplies water to its famous Patio de la Acequia. Both canals generally ran along the surface but some parts ran through tunnels cut directly into the bedrock.

After arriving at the Generalife, the canals turn towards the southeast and run past the gardens. They then join before turning back towards the Alhambra, where the water enters via an arched aqueduct next to the Torre del Agua ('Water Tower') at the Alhambra's eastern tip. From here it is channelled through the citadel via a complex system of conduits (acequias) and water tanks (albercones) which create the celebrated interplay of light, sound and surface in the palaces.

== Historic furnishings and art objects ==
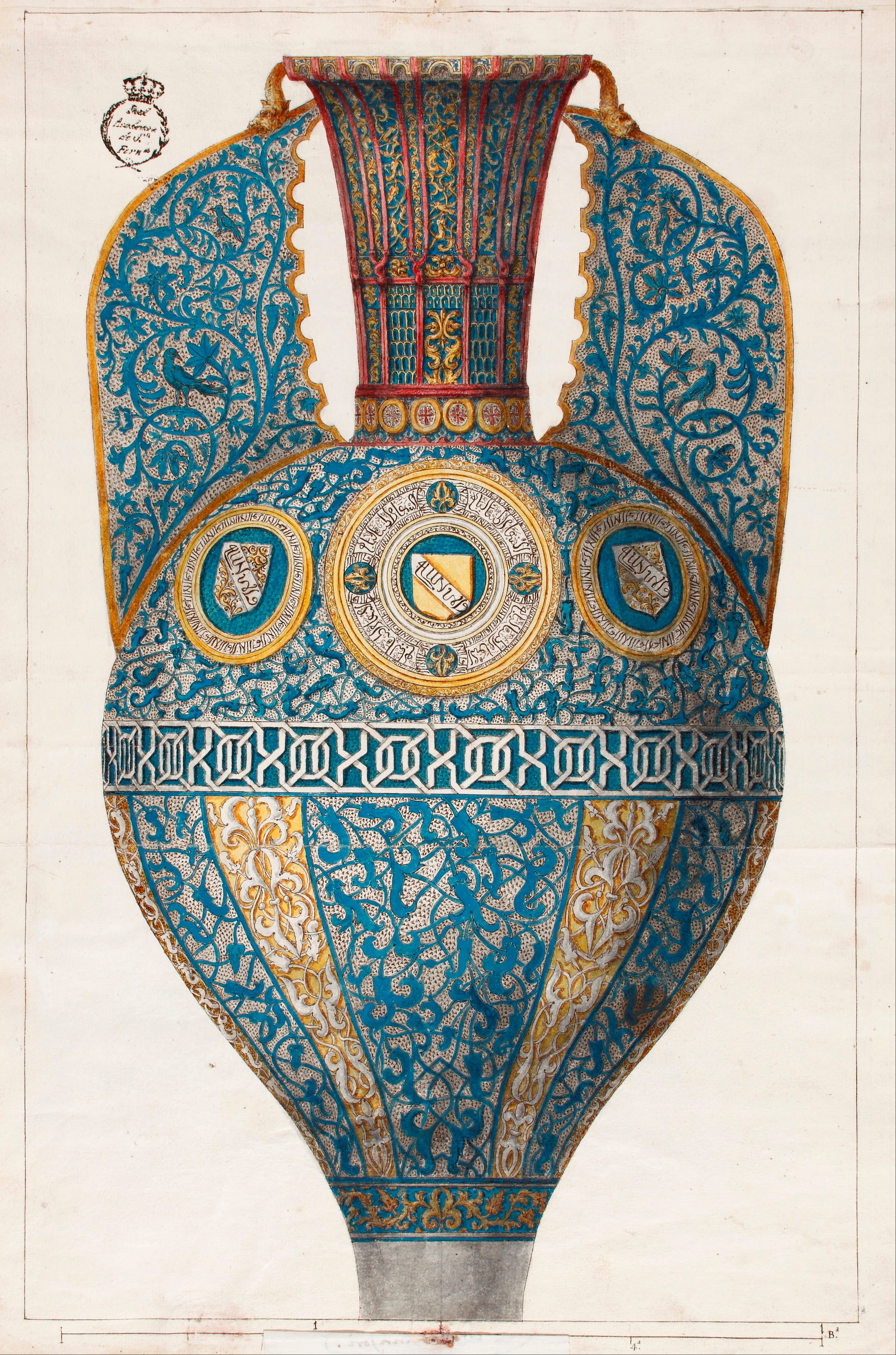
18th-century illustration of an "Alhambra vase"

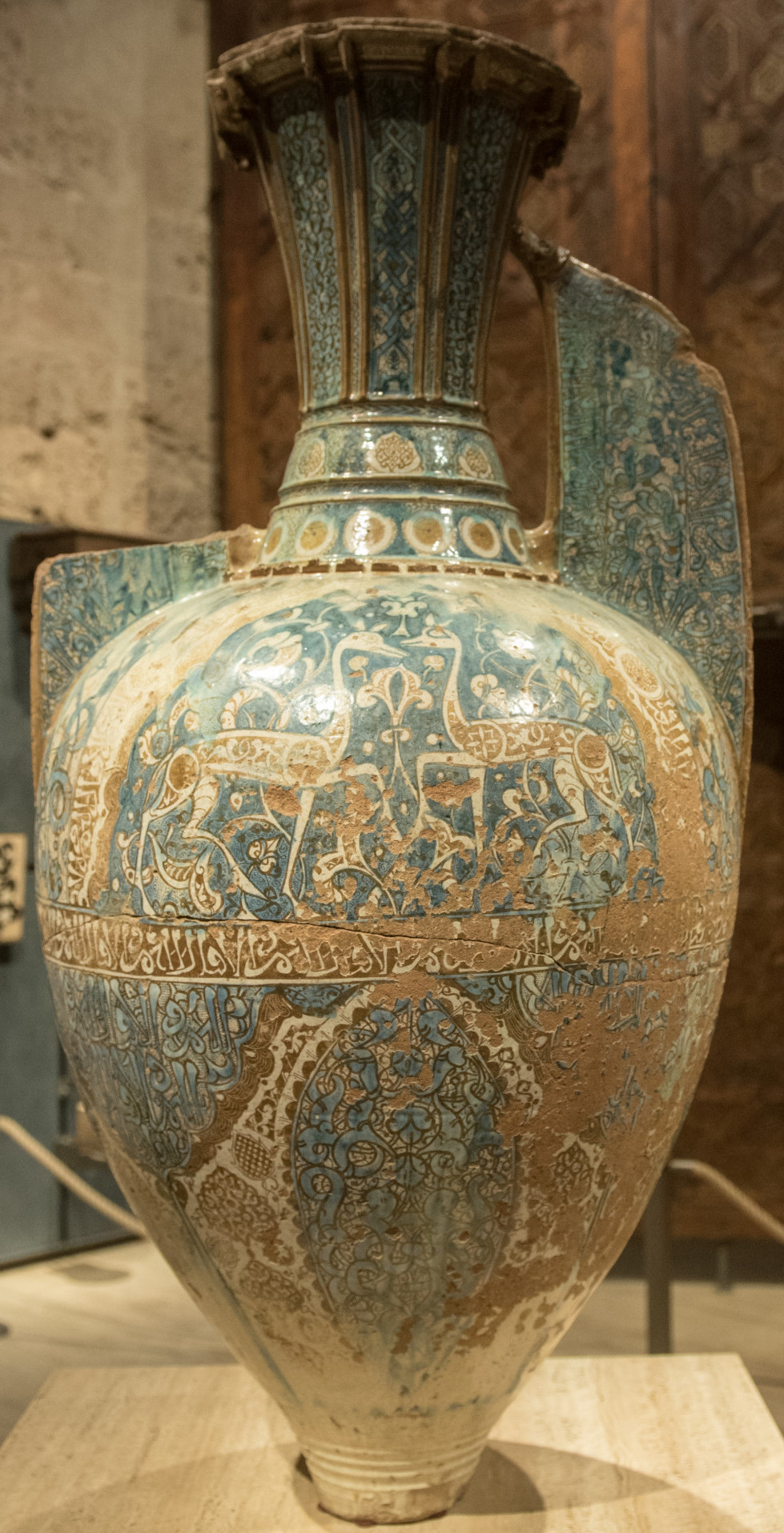
The Vase of the Gazelles at the Alhambra Museum

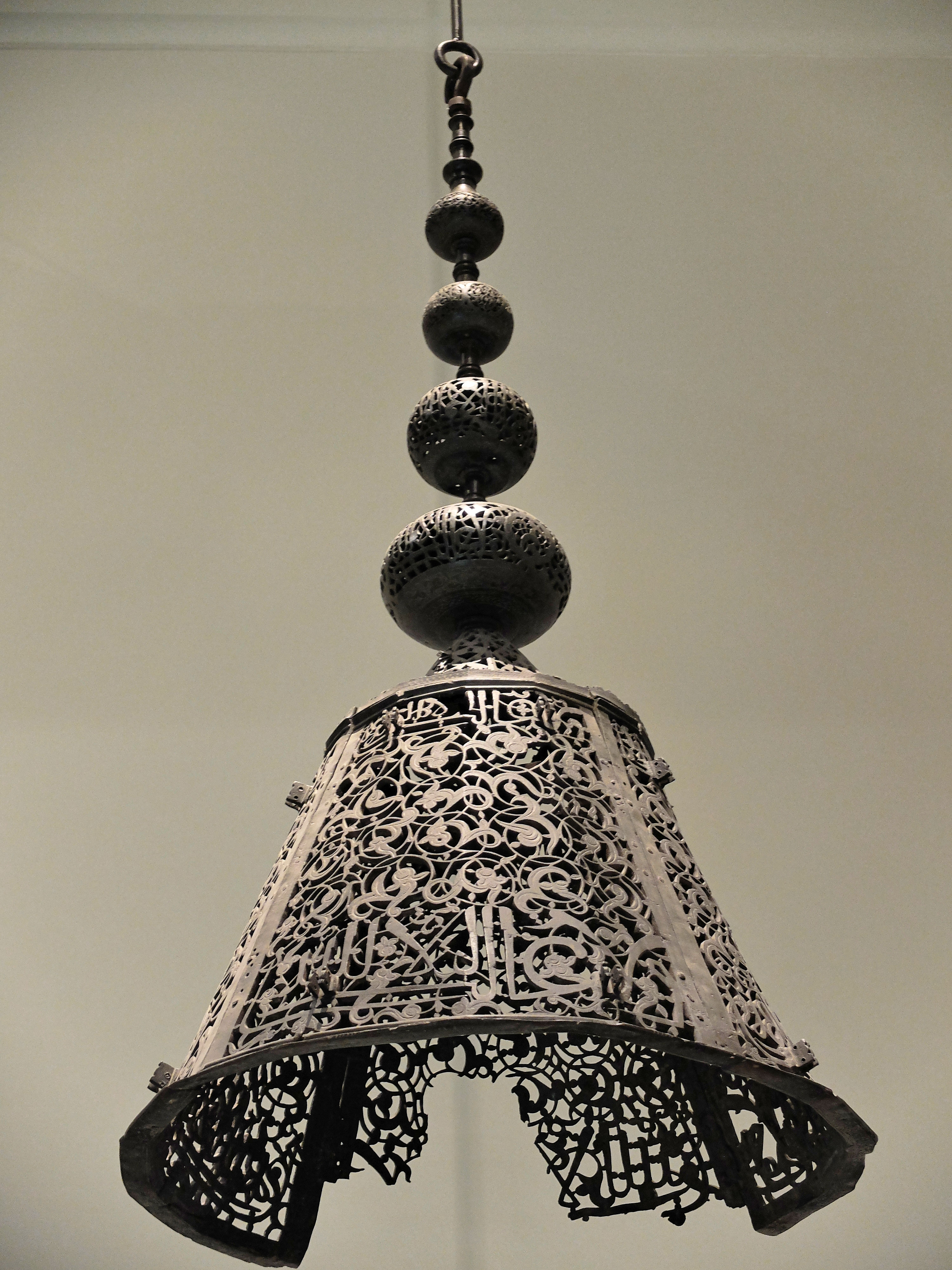
Bronze lamp from the Alhambra Mosque, dated to 1305 (housed at the National Archaeological Museum)

While the walls and rooms of the Alhambra are devoid of furnishings today, they would have originally been decorated and filled with many objects such as carpets, floor cushions, and tapestries or similar objects to be hung on the walls. The custom of sitting on the ground explains why some of the windows in the miradors (lookout rooms) were situated so low, where the eyeline of seated persons would be.

Among the most famous objects from the Nasrid palaces are the "Alhambra vases", a type of large Hispano-Moresque ware from the Nasrid period that were mostly found in the Alhambra. They stood on display in parts of the palace, probably in the corners of rooms. Their practical function, if any, is unclear but they probably served as accessories to complement the architecture. They stood about 125 centimetres tall on average, making them the largest lustreware pieces ever made. They were shaped like amphorae with narrow bases, bulging body, and narrow ribbed necks flanked by flat handles shaped like wings. They were decorated with Arabic inscriptions and other motifs, with the most common colours being cobalt blue, white, and gold. Ten vases of this kind have survived and began to be documented in the 18th century, making their way into museums afterwards. The earliest examples are dated to the late 13th or early 14th century, but the most elegant examples date from the late 14th or early 15th century. It is unclear where exactly they were produced, as there were several centres of ceramic production in the Nasrid kingdom, including Granada and Málaga. One of the best examples is the 14th-century Vase of the Gazelles, now kept at the Alhambra Museum. It stands 135 centimetres tall and is named after the image of confronted gazelles painted on its body.

Smaller jars and vases were also kept in niches in the walls and entrances of many rooms of the Alhambra. A taqa, a niche set into the walls under an archway (in the jambs), was a characteristic element of Nasrid architecture where such jars were kept, possibly filled with water for visitors. Examples of these niches are found in the entrance to the Hall of Ambassadors.

Another significant surviving object from the Alhambra is an elaborate bronze lamp that once hung in the main mosque, dated to 1305. The main section of the lamp is conical in shape, tied to a shaft or stem above which is punctuated with small spherical sections. The bronze is pierced to create Arabic inscriptions in a Naskhi script and a background of vegetal Arabesque motifs. After the 1492 conquest it was confiscated and made part of the treasury of Cardinal Cisneros. It is now on display at the National Archaeological Museum in Madrid, although a replica is also kept at the Alhambra Museum.

== Influence ==
=== In architecture ===
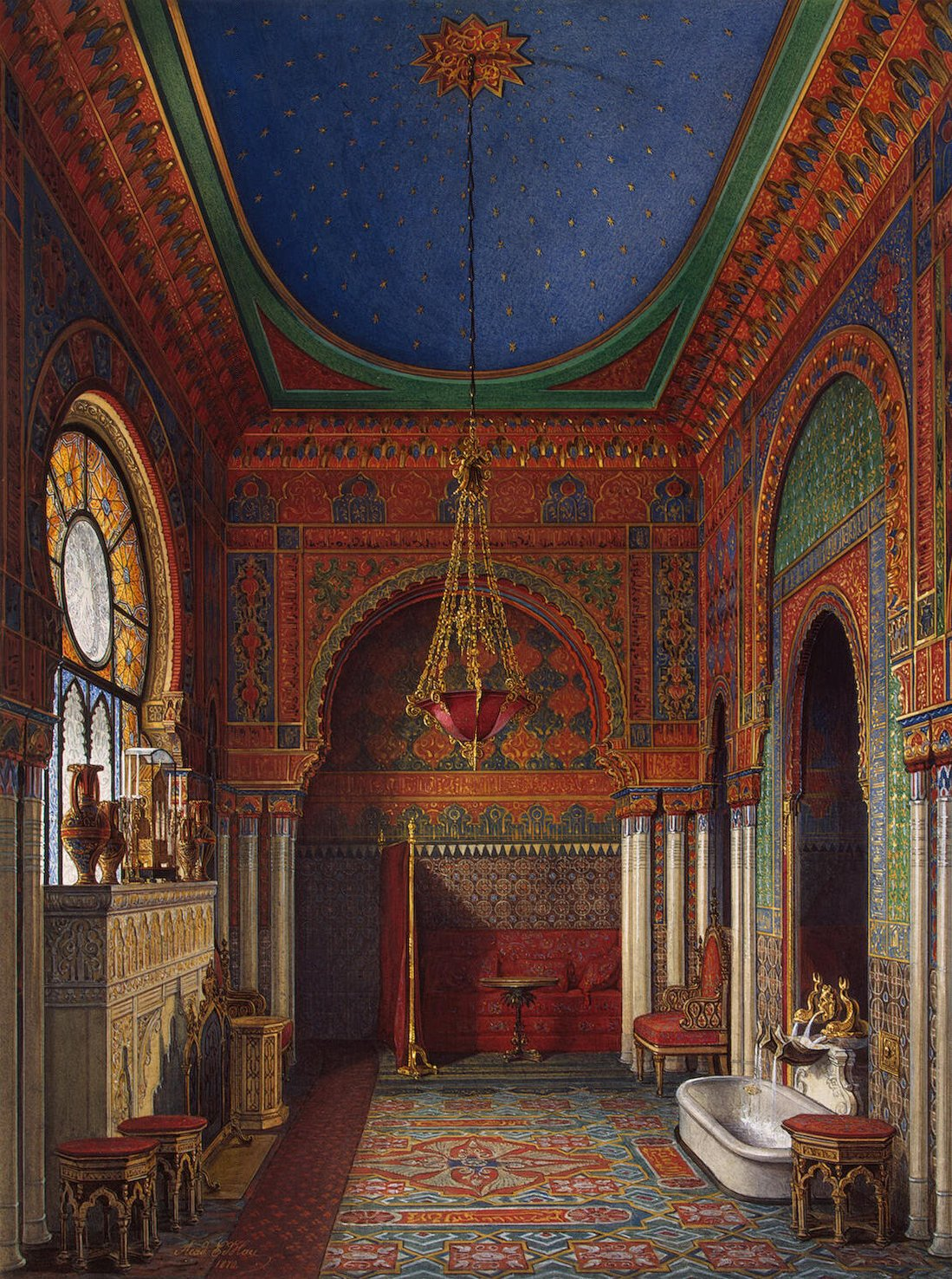
The Alhambresque bathroom of Empress Alexandra Feodorovna in the Winter Palace

The Alhambra was often remembered nostalgically in some Muslim societies after the Christian conquest of 1492 and may have influenced later examples of Islamic architecture. For example, several monuments constructed by the Saadian dynasty, which ruled Morocco in the 16th and 17th centuries, appear to imitate prototypes found in the Alhambra, particularly the Court of the Lions.

Its architecture was also a model emulated in the "Moresque" architectural style, a historicist style that became fashionable in Europe in the 19th century, with the publications of Owen Jones being particularly important in establishing this influence. After Owen Jones published Plans, Elevations, Sections and Details of the Alhambra in London from 1842 to 1845, a fanciful, ornamental, Alhambra-inspired Orientalist architectural style called Alhambresque became popular in the West in the 19th century.

The Alhambra also inspired a number of buildings in Moorish Revival architecture:

- Isaac M. Wise Temple (synagogue in Cincinnati, Ohio)
- Villa Zorayda (villa in St. Augustine, Florida)
- Villa Alhambra (villa in Malta)

The Alhambresque style was later absorbed in the Ottoman Empire, in what Ussama Makdisi called "Ottoman Orientalism". Early use of Alhambresque motifs (such as sebka) is evident in buildings from the reign of Sultan Abdülaziz (r. 1861–1876) in Istanbul, such as the monumental gate on Beyazıt Square (c. 1865), now the entrance of Istanbul University. The mausoleum of Fuad Pasha (1869–70), who personally visited the Alhambra as Ottoman ambassador in 1844, is almost entirely in a "Moresque" style. The style was also employed in the Gezira Palace in Cairo, built to host royal guests for the 1869 opening of the Suez Canal. Khedive Isma'il even commissioned Owen Jones to design the interiors of this palace.

=== In mathematics ===
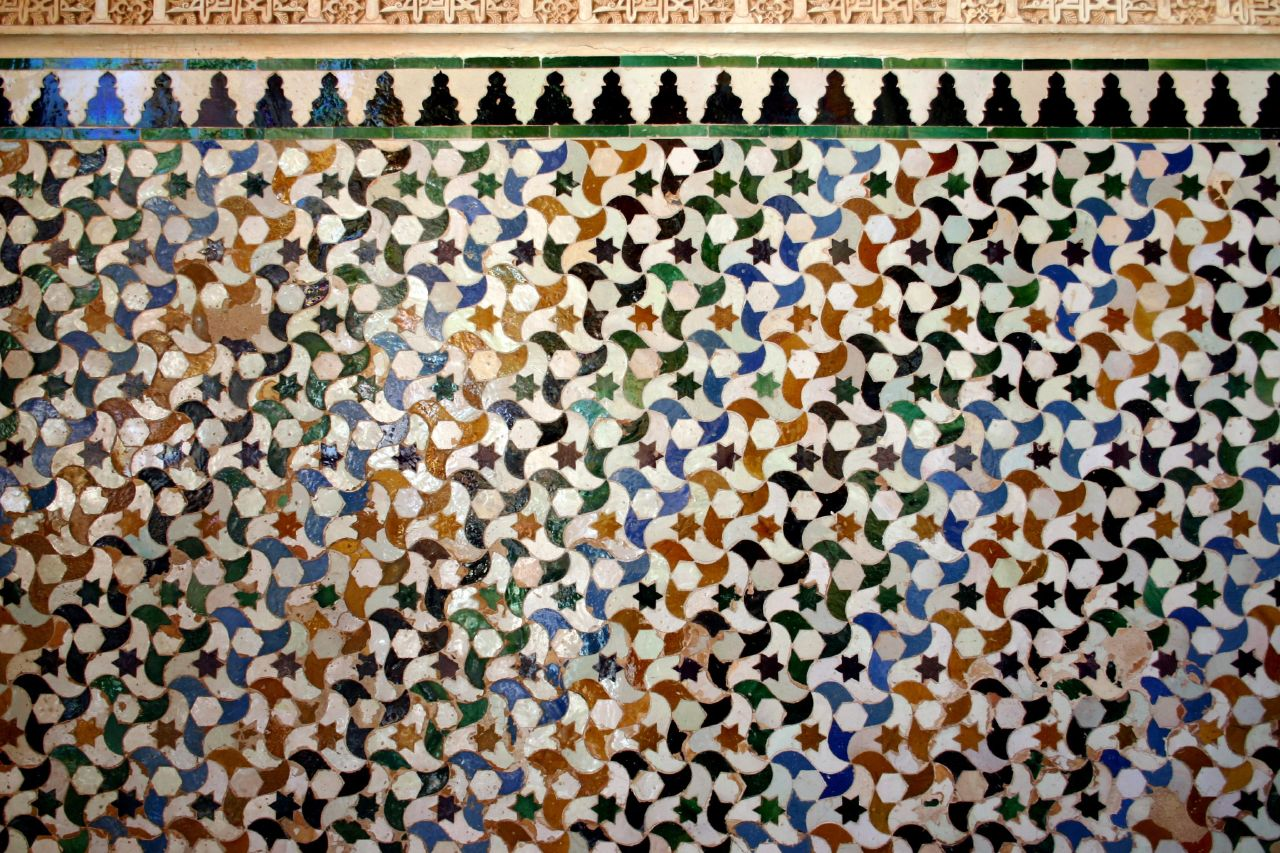
Tessellations like this inspired M. C. Escher's work.

The Alhambra tiles are remarkable in that they contain nearly all, if not all, of the seventeen mathematically possible wallpaper groups. This is a unique accomplishment in world architecture. M. C. Escher's visit in 1922 and study of the Moorish use of symmetries in the Alhambra tiles inspired his subsequent work on tessellation, which he called "regular divisions of the plane".

== See also ==
- 12 Treasures of Spain
- Alfarje
- Islamic garden
- Late medieval domes
