= Warsaw recommendation on recovery and reconstruction of cultural heritage =

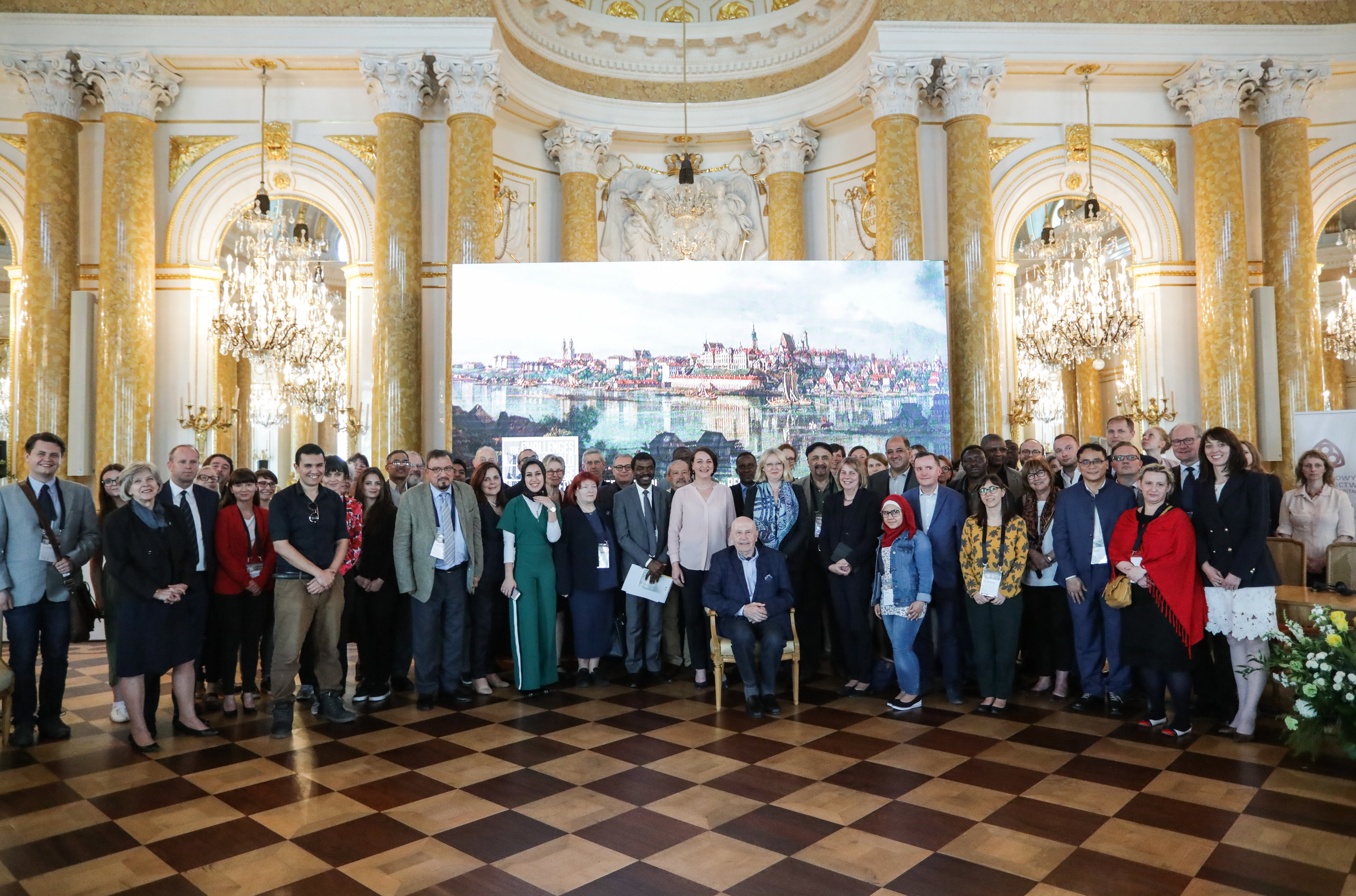
Participants of the conference "The challenges of World Heritage recovery"

Warsaw recommendation on recovery and reconstruction of cultural heritage is a document from 2018 constituting a comprehensive set of principles concerning the process of urban reconstruction and reconstruction of historic buildings or complexes of buildings destroyed as a result of armed conflicts or natural disasters.

This act of soft law is the result of the international conference, "The challenges of World Heritage recovery", which took place at the Royal Castle in Warsaw on 8 May 2018. During the conference representatives of UNESCO, ICOMOS, ICCROM, World Bank and Global Alliance for Urban Crises met for the first time to discuss problems related to the reconstruction of world heritage sites. Over 200 participants representing all regions of the world attended the meeting.

The provisions of the Warsaw Recommendation were subsequently approved in the decision of the UNESCO World Heritage Committee at its 42nd session in Manama, Bahrain (42 COM 7).

The Warsaw recommendation refers to the example and experiences of the reconstruction of Warsaw after World War II. The history of Warsaw and its unique inscription on the UNESCO World Heritage List in 1980 in recognition of the heroism and dedication of Polish society which rebuilt the capital city, has become an example for other cities affected by the tragedy of wars and disasters.
