= Nara Document on Authenticity =

The Nara Document on Authenticity is a document that addresses the need for a broader understanding of cultural diversity and cultural heritage in relation to conservation in order to evaluate the value and authenticity of cultural property more objectively. It was drafted by 45 representatives from 28 countries after their deliberation on the definition and assessment of authenticity during the Nara Conference held in Nara in November 1994.

Such a conference was first suggested by ICOMOS during the 16th meeting of the World Heritage Committee. The Japanese government took up the initiative and organized the Conference jointly with UNESCO, ICCROM and ICOMOS. The experts attending the Conference reached a consensus that "authenticity is an essential element in defining, assessing, and monitoring cultural heritage." They recognized the concept and application of the term "authenticity" actually vary from culture to culture. Therefore, when authenticity is being assessed for a particular cultural heritage, its underlying cultural context should be considered.

Before the Conference had actually started, the countries had only hoped to achieve the widening of the range of attributes that are used to assess the authenticity of cultural properties; particularly for the Government of Japan to legitimize their practice of periodic dismantle, rebuilding, repair and re-assemble of wooden heritage structures. In the end, it had not only produced a broader technical framework for authenticity analysis; but also clarified a number of long-standing delusions that had limited the scope of the application of "authenticity" to assist practical decision-making in heritage conservation field.

== The Document ==
The Nara Document is a short document that contains four main sections, they are:

=== Preamble ===
In this part, it is indicated that the Nara Document stemmed from the Venice Charter of 1964. The Document was intended to build upon it and enlarge its scope to accommodate the rapidly growing number of concerns around and interests in cultural heritage. It is stressed that "the essential contribution made by the consideration of authenticity in conservation practice is to clarify and illuminate the collective memory of humanity."

=== Cultural Diversity and Heritage Diversity ===
It is recognized that diversity in culture and heritage provide substance to all mankind. Hence such diversity should be advanced as an invaluable aspect of human development. As different cultures have different belief systems and a wide array of tangible and intangible ways to express and transmit them, it is imperative for them to respect each other, especially when one or more values are in conflict. One of the main principles of UNESCO, the universal nature and values of cultural heritage, is also stressed here.

=== Values and Authenticity ===
When a cultural heritage is being conserved, it is the values that have been bestowed upon by "all its forms and historical periods" that are being conserved. In order to make those values understandable, the heritage itself must be credible. Apart from letting ordinary people understand heritage, ensuring the authenticity of cultural heritage is also instrumental for scholarly studies, in "conservation and restoration planning," and in the inscription procedures of heritage sites on the World Heritage List.

Because the notion of what constitute values and credibility vary from culture to culture, it is of utmost importance that cultural heritage must be judged and evaluated according to the respective cultures they belong. A wide range of sources of information is encouraged to be looked-into when judging a cultural heritage's authenticity, such as design, materials and functions. They can in turn shed lights on different dimensions of the cultural heritage, like historic and social.

=== Appendixes ===
In the two appendixes of the Document, suggestions made on follow-up actions are documented. For example, to facilitate more international cooperation and dialogue, raising public's awareness towards the topic. The definitions of the term "conservation" and "information sources" are also given here.

(for details please refer to the original document by following the link under the "External Links" section)

== Evolution of Authenticity in Cultural Heritage ==
The word "authenticity" first appearance in an international conservation-related document is in the Venice Charter. It states that reconstruction of heritage sites is not allowed while only the reassembly of the originals is permissible. Even in the early versions of the World Heritage Convention's Operational Guidelines, it was stated that 'cultural properties must "meet the test of authenticity in design, materials, worksmanship, and setting"'.

At the Nara Conference, the concept of "progressive authenticities", which means the layers of history that a cultural property has acquired through time are being considered authentic attributes of that cultural property; has been confirmed. A short sentence written by David Lowenthal is precise and clear in describing this concept. It goes as '"Authenticity is in practice never absolute, always relative."'

In 2025, the Gunma Declaration on Heritage Ecosystems was adopted in Japan to mark the 30th anniversary of the Nara Document. The declaration seeks to further develop the concept of authenticity by linking tangible and intangible heritage, nature and culture, local and global perspectives, and human and more-than-human relationships. It also explicitly refers to Indigenous Peoples and the United Nations Declaration on the Rights of Indigenous Peoples in relation to World Heritage authenticity. A 2026 peer-reviewed commentary described the declaration as a significant development while also raising concerns about Indigenous participation and implementation.
