= Operational Guidelines for the Implementation of the World Heritage Convention =

UNESCO guidelines of 1977–1978

The Operational Guidelines for the Implementation of the World Heritage Convention are a series of instructions to signatory nations regarding the proper implementation of the 1972 Convention Concerning the Protection of the World Cultural and Natural Heritage. The guidelines were adopted by the UNESCO World Heritage Committee at its first session and amended at its second session in 1978.

== History ==
The first text of the Operational Guidelines was titled Operational Guidelines for the World Heritage Committee. It dates back to 1977 at the First Session of the World Heritage Committee (27 June - 1 July) in Paris. The Drafting Committee and the World Heritage Committee prepared the text. It contained four chapters and twenty-eight paragraphs. In October same year, the Operational Guidelines for the Implementation of the World Heritage with 27 paragraphs followed. A year later, at the Second Session of the Intergovernmental Committee for the Protection of the World Cultural and Natural Heritage, the Operational Guidelines was adopted with 30 paragraphs.

The World Heritage Committee, the main body responsible for the Implementation of the World Heritage Convention, has revised its text ever since adding paragraphs updating it with new concepts, knowledge or experiences.

The 2011 Operational Guidelines is the latest version dating from November 2011 and available in English, French, Portuguese and Spanish. A revised Draft dating from February 2011 with limited distribution is available online.

== Contents ==
=== Introduction ===
The 2011 version of the Operational Guidelines contains two hundred and ninety paragraphs which reflect the aim of the Intergovernmental Committee for the Protection of the Cultural and Natural Heritage to further facilitate the Implementation of the 1972 Convention.

The key users of the guidelines are not only the signatory nations. (States Parties to the 1972 Convention) The Secretariat of the World Heritage Committee based at the World Heritage Centre in Paris, the Advisory Bodies, site managers, stakeholders and partners all active in the protection of World Heritage properties are also invited to make usage of the Operational Guidelines.

=== Aim ===
The first chapter of the Operational Guidelines aims to facilitate the implementation of the 1972 World Heritage Convention. The major goals and procedure of the convention are given reflecting certain articles of the Convention in a more detailed explanation.

The main bodies of the 1972 Convention i.e. the General Assembly, the World Heritage Committee, the Secretariat, the Advisory Bodies IUCN, ICOMOS, ICCROM are presented in detail precising their role, tasks, specific responsibilities, moreover meeting sessions, term of office, contact informations etc. A list of functions of the World Heritage Committee in cooperation with the States Parties is provided. Most functions derives from Articles 11(2+4+7), Article 13(6), Article 21(1+3) and Article 29(3) of the World Heritage Convention.

In general the overall aim of the Convention and its Guidelines is to safeguard heritage of universal value for future generations. It is to give a guidance on how properties can be inscribed on the World Heritage List or/and the List of World Heritage in Danger if the properties are facing serious dangers and are in need of emergency inscription. The Birthplace of Jesus: Church of the Nativity and the Pilgrimage Route, Bethlehem were thus inscribed in 2012.

For the purpose of facilitating the nomination process for properties considered to be of universal value, World Heritage is defined so as to categorize heritage into cultural, natural, and mixed sites to be handled specifically. Other specific types of Heritage like e.g. Cultural landscape is a category of heritage acknowledged only since 1992 out of the need to recognize and protect the "combined work of man and nature".

All informations consisting the World Heritage List and the way to it is to be found in Chapter 2.

=== Criteria for inscription ===
Before properties can be proposed for inscription as a World Heritage Site, they must be on the tentative lists of the States Parties. The properties must be of Outstanding Universal Value (OUV) which means "cultural and/or natural significance which is so exceptional as to transcend national boundaries and to be of common importance for present and future generations of all humanity". There are ten criteria for the assessment of OUV. Criteria (i)-(vi) for cultural heritage, (vii)-(x) for natural heritage. Properties nominated under criteria (i) to (vi)- cultural Heritage - must fulfill the conditions of authenticity i.e. originality in form and design, materials, use and function etc. Cultural and natural properties must satisfy the conditions of integrity i.e. wholeness, intactness.

The term OUV is used throughout the World Heritage Convention but only defined and explained in detail in the Operational Guidelines from paragraphs 79–95.

The protection and management systems should be in place to ensure that the OUV is kept and the Heritage is passed to future generations.

=== Process for Inscription ===
The Operational Guidelines outlines the importance of participation of community and a wide range of stakeholders in the nomination process. It informs about the sources for help and guidance throughout the nomination process.(Chapter 3)

Furthermore, detailed information is given for the inscription requirements for different types of properties. The nomination format Annex 5 must be used. The nomination file must be sent to the World Heritage Centre. The specific dates for submission and further processes and procedure for registration are also clarified. A nomination can be withdrawn any time prior to the Committee annual session in which nomination of properties take place.

The World Heritage Committee decides for inscription of a property by adopting the Statement of OUV. (paragraph 154–157) If the decision is not to inscribe, the property may not be presented again. When additional information is needed the nomination will be referred (para 159) or deferred (para 160) for more in depth assessment or study.

The Guidelines also reveal when conditions for deletion (Chapter IV.C ) of a World Heritage Site apply. e.g. Dresden Elbe Valley, and what steps are to be taken to ensure for the long-term protection and conservation of UNESCO sites.

=== Requirements ===
To make sure that a World Heritage Site is protected and transmitted to future generations, the Operational Guidelines give directions to a more effective long-term conservation system i.e. a periodic reporting (Chapter 5 The World Heritage Committee has adopted the Format and Explanatory Notes to be found in Annex 7. State Parties are invited to submit Periodic reports every six years. The World Heritage Committee following the table set in paragraph 203 C will examine the reports. The format consists of two Sections. Section I refers to the legislative and administrative provisions while section II refers to the state of conservation of specific World Heritage properties located on the territory of the State Party concerned. The address of the UNESCO World Heritage Centre for report submission can be found in Paragraph 207.

=== Annexes ===
1. Model Instrument of Ratification / Acceptance / Accession
2. 2A. Tentative List submission Format 2B. Tentative List submission Format for serial transnational and transboundary future nominations
3. Guidelines on the inscription of specific types of properties on the world Heritage List
4. Authenticity in relation to the World Heritage Convention
5. Format for the nomination of properties for inscription on the World Heritage list
6. Evaluation procedures of the Advisory Bodies for nominations
7. Format for the Periodic Reporting on the application of the World Heritage Convention
8. International Assistance Request Form International Assistance
9. Evaluation Criteria of the Advisory Bodies for International Assistance requests
10. Statement of Outstanding Universal Value
11. Modifications to World Heritage Properties

All the above documents are annexed at the end of the Operational Guidelines
