= Thowsen =

Thowsen is a surname. Notable people with the surname include:

- Atle Thowsen (born 1940), Norwegian historian
- Pål Thowsen (born 1955), Norwegian jazz drummer

== See also ==
- Thomsen
