= Ingo Heidbrink =

German maritime historian (born 1968)

Ingo Heidbrink (born 1968) is a German maritime historian who is Professor of History with a specialization on Maritime History at Old Dominion University in Norfolk, Virginia. He is specialized on Fisheries History, Traditional Watercraft and Museum Ships, Methodology of Maritime History and interdisciplinary research projects. Since Summer 2021 he is Chair of the Department of History at Old Dominion University.

== Academic education and professional positions ==
Heidbrink studied Social and Economic History at the University of Hamburg (Germany), where he got his M.A. in 1994 and his Dr.phil. in 1999. His doctoral thesis on German inland-waterway tanker-shipping was supervised by Ulrich Troitzsch as well as his earlier MA-thesis on traditional watercraft. In 2004, he finished his habilitation (German professorial degree) at the University of Bremen (Germany) with a thesis on the history of German deep-sea fishing industry in the 20th century. After positions at various maritime museums in Germany Heidbrink became the founding head of the department of fisheries history at the German Maritime Museum / Deutsches Schiffahrtsmuseum in Bremerhaven in 1996. From 2000 to 2002, he was a research fellow at the Hanse Institute for Advanced Study (HWK) in Delmenhorst. Hereafter he returned to the German Maritime Museum. Since 2000, he taught at the University of Bremen where he became Privatdozent in 2004 and one of the Principal Investigators of the Bremen International Graduate School for Marine Sciences – Global Change in the Marine Realm (GLOMAR). In 2003 and 2007, he was guest lecturer at the Ilisimatusarfik, the University of Greenland. In 2008, he was appointed Associate Professor for Maritime History at the History Department of Old Dominion University in Norfolk, VA, where he was Graduate Program Director of the history program from 2009 to 2013. In summer 2010, he was promoted to Professor of History. In addition to his position at Old Dominion University, he is Honorary Research Fellow at the Maritime Historical Studies Centre (Blaydes Maritime Centre) at the University of Hull, UK.

Heidbrink has been selected as a research fellow at the Rachel Carson Center at LMU Munich, a newly established federal think tank for environmental history. Beside his academic career he holds a masters license for commercial watercraft on inland waterways and is an appointed surveyor for historical watercraft and museum ships in Germany.

== Scholarly work ==
Heidbrink's scholarly work is dedicated to several sub-topics of maritime history:

Since the mid-1990s, he dealt intensively with the theoretical framework behind the restoration and operation of museum ships and traditional vessels. His most important contribution to this particular field of research was that he authored together with Arne Gotved and John Robinson the “Barcelona Charter – European Charter for the Conservation and Restoration of traditional ships in operation” which was adopted by the European association of owners of such vessels (European Maritime Heritage) in 2003 and is recognized as an international standard for such vessels by many European governments.

Towards the end of the 1990s, Heidbrink's research was mainly dedicated to the history of European inland-waterway navigation and his book on inland-waterway tanker navigation became standard for this field of research.

Since 2000, his publications mainly focus on fisheries history and the Law of the Sea and especially his book on the fishing conflicts of the 20th century was discussed controversial, because he stated that the European distant-water fisheries of the late 19th and 20th century have been a kind of common economic colonialism in the North Atlantic area.

Beside this concrete research he dealt with the methodological improvement of maritime history and is part of a movement that wants to widen the scope of maritime history to a universal history of the interaction of humans and the oceans. As a part of this methodological work, he was involved in the design of new scholarly educational schemes that combine marine sciences with the humanities and social sciences and were realized for example in the Bremen International Graduate School for Marine Sciences – Global Change in the Marine Realm (GLOMAR) or the Mitigation and Adaption Research Institute (MARI) at Old Dominion University.

== International scholarly organizations ==
Heidbrink is involved in a variety of international organizations dedicated to research in Maritime History. In 2005, he was elected to Assistant Secretary General of the International Commission for Maritime History (ICMH). In September 2009 he took over as Acting Secretary General of the ICMH after the previous Secretary General stepped back from the office and was elected to Secretary General in August 2010. He is president of the North Atlantic Fisheries History Association (NAFHA) and an Expert Member of the International Polar Heritage Committee (IPHC), one of the 28 International Scientific Committees within ICOMOS.

== Other ==
The maritime historian Ingo Heidbrink should not be mistaken for Ingo Heidbrink of Switzerland, who seems to be involved in the amusement industry.

== Publications (selection) ==
=== Monographs ===
- Schrott oder Kulturgut. Zur Bewertung historischer Wasserfahrzeuge aus der Perspektive des Historikers. Bestandserfassung - Bewertung - quellengerechte Erhaltung. Lage / Lippe 1994.
- Deutsche Binnentankschiffahrt 1887–1994. Hamburg (Convent Vlg.) 2000.
- together with: Werner Beckmann and Matthias Keller: ... und heute gibt es Fisch - 100 Jahre Fischindustrie und Fischgroßhandel in Schlaglichtern. Bremen (Hauschild Vlg) 2003.
- “Deutschlands einzige Kolonie ist das Meer”. Die deutsche Hochseefischerei und die Fischereikonflikte des 20. Jahrhunderts. Hamburg (Convent Vlg) 2004.

=== Edited publications ===
- Konfliktfeld Küste – Ein Lebensraum wird erforscht. (= Hanse Studien Bd.3). Oldenburg (BIS) 2003.
- The “Barcelona Charter”. European Charter for the Conservation and Restoration of Traditional Ships in Operation. Bremen, Andijk (Hauschild Vlg.) 2003.
- together with David J. Starkey & Jon Th. Thor: A History of the North Atlantic Fisheries: Vol. 1, From Early Times to the mid-Nineteenth Century. Bremen (Hauschild Vlg. & Deutsches Schiffahrtsmuseum) 2009.

=== Articles ===
- Vocational training in the German Deep-Sea Fishing Industry. In: International Journal of Maritime History Vol. XI, 1999, No. 2. pp 143–153.
- Museumsschiffe Baujahr 1999. Anmerkungen zum Wiederaufbau historischer See- und Binnenschiffe. In: Deutsches Schiffahrtsarchiv 22, 1999, pp 43–58.
- Kaitai ka hozon ka. Doitsu ni okeru ogata konsen no hozon ninen to hekishi keiken to jitsurei. In: Miraini tsunagu jinnouino waza 2. Senpaku no hozon shutuku. Tokyo 2002. pp 58–70.
- Ibunka kann ni okeru kaiji isan no hozon ni tsuite. Nihon to EMH to no kagakutekikoryu. In: Miraini tsunagu jinnouino waza 2. Senpaku no hozon shutuku. Tokyo 2002. pp 143–145.
- Det tyske havgående fiskeri og Grønland: vejen til et gennembrud for det internationale fjernfiskeri. In: Ilisimatusarfik (Ed.): Grønlandsk kultur-og samfundsforskning 2003. Nuuk 2004. pp 57–69.
- Historic Ship Safety. In: Starkey, David J., Hahn-Pedersen, Morten (Eds.): Bridging Troubled Waters. Conflict and Co-operation in the North Sea Region since 1550. 7th North Sea History Conference, Dunkirk 2002. Esbjerg 2005. pp 221–225.
- The Oceans as the Common Property of Mankind from early modern Period to Today. In: History Compass Vol. 6 (2008). link
- Til Nordpolen! Om Den første tyske Polarekspedition 1868 – og om det stadig eksisterende ekspeditionsskip “Grönland”. In: Ilisimatusarfik (Ed.): Grønlandsk kultur-og samfundsforskning 2008–09. Nuuk 2009. 191–203.
- Beyond the North Sea – The Emergence of Germany's Distant-Water Trawling Industry. In: Starkey, David J., Thorleifsen, Daniel, Robinson, Robb (Eds.): Conflict, Overfishing and Spatial Expansion in the North Atlantic Fisheries, c. 1400–2000. (=Studia Atlantica 6). Hull 2010.
- A Second Industrial Revolution in the Distant Water Fisheries? Factory-Freezer Trawlers in the 1950s and 1960s. In: International Journal of Maritime History, Vol. XXIII, 2011, No. 1, 179–192.
