= Mounir Bouchenaki =

Algerian archaeologist

Mounir Bouchenaki منير بوشناقي

2nd Director of ARC-WH
- Incumbent
- Assumed office June 2013

Personal details
- Born: 16 November 1943 (age 82) Tlemcen, French Algeria
- Education: Université d’Aix-en-Provence

Mounir Bouchenaki (Arabic: منير بوشناقي; born 16 November 1943) is an Algerian archaeologist and incumbent Director of the Arab Regional Centre for World Heritage. He was Director-General of ICCROM from 2006 to 2011, UNESCO's Assistant Director General for Culture (2000-2006), Director of the World Heritage Centre (1998-2000), Director of UNESCO's Cultural Heritage Division (1990-2000). In January 2011, he was named honorary special adviser of UNESCO Director-General Irina Bokova and of ICCROM Director-General.

== Early years ==
Mounir Bouchenaki was born on 16 November 1943 in Tlemcen in French Algeria to an Algerian family, of Bosniak origin. Having obtained at Alger University and obtained a Postgraduate Diploma in Ancient History, he went on to become Curator of the archaeological site and museum of Tipaza from 1966 to 1971, when he had carried out a major operation to safeguard a new archaeological ancient necropolis. Meanwhile, within the Algerian-Italian cooperation framework he had attended, in 1968, an internship at the University of Rome "Istituto del Vicino Oriente" and he had participated in archaeological excavations in Sardinia (summers 1968, 1969, 1970 and 1971).

From 1969 to 1973, with ICCROM's technical support, he worked on the conservation of a unique fresco dating from the 5th century BC, and a mosaic of the same period discovered and transferred to the Tipasa Museum. Paul-Albert Février, Henri-Irénée Marrou and Bishop Saxer of the Pontifical Institute had visited the excavation and provided technical advice and supervision of fieldwork.

He was appointed Director of the Antiquities Service from 1972 to 1974. As Chief Curator of Algerian museums and archaeological sites, he had started with his colleagues a series of archaeological excavations with the support of foreign archaeological missions (Italy, Germany and Great Britain) and he had supervised development projects for establishing Cherchel and Chetif museums.

When, from 1974 to 1976, he became the deputy director of Archaeology, Museums and Historical Monuments, he had launched a number of restoration projects. The most significant were: the consolidation and restoration of the minaret dating from the 10th century located in the medieval site of Qala'a Beni Hammad; the restoration of the 14th century Sidi Bou Mediène mosque, located in Tlemcen city; while, the mausoleum of Medracen dating from the 3rd century AD was partially restored with the Italian cooperation backing. Besides, within the framework of German development cooperation, two archaeological research campaigns had been undertaken in Lambèse and Siga. Moreover, in response to some significant discoveries in Setif in 1974 and 1975, a rescue excavation was conducted with the backing of Professor Paul-Albert Février, vice-president of the University of Aix-en-Provence.

He held, from 1976 to 1981 the position of Cultural Heritage Director in the Algerian Ministry of Information and Culture. Hereafter, a major restoration project was set up at the Dey Palace in the higher part of the Kasbah in cooperation with the PKZ. In Bonn, in 1978, under the title «Die Numider», it had been organized a considerable exhibition of about ten tonnes of Roman and Pre-Roman works of art taken from the major Algerian museums. While in 1978, within the framework of the French Cooperation, a range of conferences and workshops had been held on the conservation of cultural heritage, and an international conference was organized on Tassili's cave arts. At last, with the assistance of the Roman department of the "British Museum", a rescue excavation was carried out in Cherchel.

In parallel to his responsibilities for «Antiquities Service» he was in charge, as assistant professor at Alger University, of Ancient History teaching from 1969 to 1981. He had also completed in 1973 his PhD in Archaeology and Ancient History of North Africa at the Aix-en-Provence university in France.

== UNESCO career ==
He joined UNESCO in 1982, as a Project Manager in the International Affairs Division. He had been responsible until 1985 for preparing and supervising three projects, one in Saudi Arabia and two in Libya. Financed by «Funds-in-Trust», the projects were respectively establishing, at King Faisal Foundation, of the Islamic Centre for Research and Restoration of Manuscripts, creating Tripoli National Museum, and studying ancient Libyan valleys. in the same time, he and Professor Ronald Lewcock worked out the action plans for the launching of two international campaigns to safeguard the Old City of Sana'a and the city of Shibam which houses are all made out of mud brick (Earthen Architecture).

From 1985 to 1990, when he was appointed Section Chief for Operational Activities, he has developed and coordinated the implementation of international campaigns projects initiated by UNESCO, for safeguarding Medina of Fez in Morocco, the archaeological site of Carthage in Tunis, the Old City of Sana'a and the city of Shibam in Hadramaut in Yemen, the archaeological site of Tyre in Lebanon, the creation of the Museum of Nubia and the Museum of Egyptian Civilization in Cairo, as well as operational activities concerning monuments and sites not yet inscribed on the World Heritage List in various parts of the world.

Promoted as Director of the Cultural Heritage Division of UNESCO's Culture Sector, He was in charge, from 1990 to 2000, of planning and coordinating the protection of cultural heritage in different areas of the world. During his mandate, emphasis was given to projects associating the conservation and preservation of cultural heritage to local socioeconomic development. And with a fundraising strategy seeking mainly public contributions but also private, several such projects were launched in Asia, Latin America, and Africa. Among which, those that involved the Hue Site in Vietnam, the Kathmandu Valley in Nepal, the Jiahoe site and Peking Men Site in China, the historic center of Quito in Ecuador, the conservation of Moai statues on Easter Island, the Great Wall of Zimbabwe, the rock churches of Lalibela Ethiopia.

In 1992, in the aftermath of Taif Agreement that put an end to the Lebanese Civil War he was called to draw up the first report on the situation of cultural heritage in Lebanon and to supervise the rehabilitation operations of Beirut Museum. From 1993 to 1994 he was deployed in Vukovar, Croatia than in Sarajevo and Mostar, Bosnia Herzegovina, where he was assigned to conduct the coordination of the reconstruction work of Mostar bridge, terminated in 2004. Such an effort was unanimously appreciated by Bosnia-Herzegovina authorities, who granted him the Bosnian citizenship.

He was in charge of the direction of UNESCO's World Heritage Centre from 1998 to 2000. And as he carried out simultaneously the responsibilities of Director of the Cultural Heritage Division, he has strengthened the co-ordination of the activities of the centre with those of the corresponding divisions within the Sectors of Culture and Natural Sciences. Bouchenaki has kept on developing the convention analysis process and the implementation of its institutional arrangements by setting-up three working groups: one on the Representativity of the World Heritage List, another on UNESCO's global strategy, and a third on Equitable Representation within the World Heritage Committee.

In January 2001 he has been appointed to the post of Assistant Director-General for Culture, a position he held until February 2006. Under his leadership, and at the request of Member States, Bouchenaki was in charge of coordinating the various stages of preparing normative instruments of all types, such as the Convention on the Protection of the Underwater Cultural Heritage adopted on 2 November 2001 by the General Conference, the Convention for the Safeguarding of the Intangible Cultural Heritage adopted in 2003, and the Convention on the Protection and Promotion of the Diversity of Cultural Expressions adopted in 2005. Furthermore, He was in charge of monitoring sensitive issues, such as the destruction in Afghanistan of the great Bamiyan Buddha statues by the Taliban in 2001, the second war in Iraq (2002-2003) and the Kosovo conflict (2003 - 2004) and their impact on cultural heritage.

In the field of the intangible cultural heritage, he ran the programme of the Proclamation of Masterpieces of the Oral and Intangible Heritage of Humanity. This programme was initiated in 1997 under the authority of UNESCO's Director-General, M. Koïchiro Matsuura. Bouchenaki has taken on the responsibility of supervising the programme with the participation of Section of Intangible Heritage led by Ms. Noriko Aikawa then by Rieks Smeets from 1997 to 2006. He had jointly coordinated the programme implementation.

Elected, in November 2005, Director General of ICCROM by its General Assembly member states. He assumed office just in March 2006, at the express request of the UNESCO's Director-General. For nearly six years, he led this specialized intergovernmental institution established by UNESCO and headquartered in Rome. For strengthening the role of ICCROM in the field of training in conservation and restoration of cultural property, Bouchenaki has increased the number of ICCROM's Member States, passing from 116 to 132. He has as well developed new operational partnerships with ALESCO, the Emirate of Sharjah, Tongji University in Shanghai (China), South Korea Cultural Properties Administration, The Getty Foundation, the Getty Conservation Institute and the World Monuments Fund, the Smithsonian Institution in the United States, the British School of Archaeology in Rome and also with Italian universities and public and private institutions of the country. He has supervised ICCROM's research and training programmes, and launched the new ICCROM course: first aid to cultural heritage in times of conflict. He proceeded with the establishment in Sharjah of Athar, an institute with the aim of training conservation professionals in the Arab region, within the framework of an agreement signed with Sheikh Sultan bin Muhammad Al-Qasimi, ruler of Sharjah.

== Publications and articles ==
- Le Mausolée Royal de Maurétanie, Alger, SNED, 1970.

- Fouilles de la nécropole occidentale de Tipasa, Alger, Bibliothèque Nationale, 1975.

- Cités Antiques d’Algérie, Alger, Ministère de la Culture, 1975, re ed.1980.

- Jugurtha, un roi berbère et sa guerre contre Rome, dans Collection « Les Africains », Jeune Afrique Editions, Paris 1977.

- La Monnaie de l’Emir Abd-El-Kader, Alger, Bibliothèque Nationale, 1976.

- Tipasa, site du patrimoine mondial, Alger, ENAG, 1989.

Il a publié plusieurs articles dans les revues suivantes : Revue “reflets”, Commission nationale algérienne pour l’UNESCO; Bulletin d’Archéologie Algérienne, Alger; Antiquités Africaines, Aix en Provence; Oriens Antiquus, Rome; l’Année Epigraphique, Paris; Römische Mitteilungen, Rome; Revue d’Histoire et de Civilisation du Maghreb, Alger; Le Courrier de l’UNESCO, Paris; Museum International, UNESCO, Paris.
