= The Great Circle =

The Great Circle may refer to:

- The Great Circle, a 1997 novel by Peter Prince
- The Great Circle (periodical), journal of the Australian Association for Maritime History
- The Great Circle Tour, a 2017 world tour by the band Midnight Oil
- Great Circle Earthworks, a section of the Newark Earthworks in Ohio, US
- The Great Circle, the book series of Andromeda (novel)

== See also ==
- Great circle, the intersection of a sphere and a plane that passes through the center point of the sphere
- Great Circle (novel), a 2021 novel by Maggie Shipstead
- Indiana Jones and the Great Circle, a video game in the Indiana Jones franchise
