= Barcelona Charter =

International standard for watercraft restoration

The Barcelona Charter, in full the European Charter for the Conservation and Restoration of Traditional Ships in Operation is an informal but widely accepted standard for maintenance and restoration projects on historic watercraft that are still in operation as active sailing vessels.

== Background ==
More than a thousand historic watercraft of all sizes are still in operation in Europe. Only a small number of them are registered monuments or real museum ships, while nearly all of them have a certain historic or cultural value in the context of maritime or regional history. The wide majority of historic watercraft are owned and operated by private owners, associations, foundations etc. European Maritime Heritage, the European umbrella organization for traditional vessels in operation, decided to develop a code of best practice for the conservation and restoration of such vessels to safeguard the historic value of these vessels and to define minimum methodological standards for any work to be carried out on these vessels. A working group mainly consisting of Arne Gotved, John Robinson and the professional maritime historian Ingo Heidbrink drafted the text of the Charter which was finally adopted by European Maritime Heritage in 2003.

== Contents ==
The Barcelona Charter describes in a few paragraphs how conservation and restoration of traditional ships in operation should be done. The basic principles are developed on the basis of the Charter of Venice and include for example the requirement for proper documentation of all work carried out as well as proper historical background research as a basis for all work to be done. The aim of all paragraphs is to safeguard the particular historic value of a vessel for future generations although the vessel is still in operation and therefore must comply with certain modern safety regulations. The original text of the Charter was written in English, but unofficial translations are available for a number of European languages (Catalan, Dutch, French, German and Portuguese). A detailed commentary on all paragraphs of the Charter was developed by the maritime historian Ingo Heidbrink.

== Relevance ==
Although the Barcelona Charter is not a binding legal instrument, it is widely accepted as a code of best practice and is recognized by several European marine safety authorities as well as national owner organizations of historic watercraft. Despite the fact that the Barcelona Charter was written mainly as a European Charter, the principles of the Charter can be applied globally and were, for example, published by the National Research Institute for Restoration and Conservation of Japan.

== See also ==
- Sailing ship
- Athens Charter for the Restoration of Historic Monuments
- Venice Charter — Charter for the Conservation and Restoration of Monuments and Sites
- Riga Charter for the conservation, restoration, maintenance and use of historic railway equipment
- Historic preservation
