= Arab Regional Centre for World Heritage =

2010 establishment in Bahrain

- Abbreviation: ARC-WH
- Formation: 2010/02/05
- Type: GO
- Legal status: Category 2 Centre under the auspices of UNESCO
- Purpose: Promote World Heritage Convention
- Headquarters: Manama, Bahrain
- Official language: Arabic, English, French
- Chairwoman: H.E. Sh. Mai Bint Mohammed Al Khalifa
- Director: Shadia Touqan
- Website: arcwh.org

The Arab Regional Centre for World Heritage (French: centre régional arabe pour le patrimoine mondial; Arabic: المركز الإقليمي العربي للتراث العالمي) is a Category 2 Centre under the auspices of UNESCO. It was founded as an autonomous and independent Bahraini public institution in 2010.

The ARC-WH purpose is to reinforce the implementation of the World Heritage Convention in the Arab States region, by enhancing the knowledge of it, promoting the Operational Guidelines and the cooperating among the States Parties of the Arab States region.

ARC-WH is meant to respond to the provisions of the Global Strategy for a Representative, Balanced and Credible World Heritage List is also intended to assist the implementation of the Global Training Strategy for World Cultural and Natural Heritage (Helsinki, 2001).

ARC-WH has 19 member States: Algeria, Bahrain, Egypt, Iraq, Jordan, Kuwait, Lebanon, Libya, Mauritania, Morocco, Oman, Palestine, Qatar, Saudi Arabia, Sudan, Syrian Arab Republic, Tunisia, United Arab Emirates and Yemen.

The main objective of ARC-WH is to assist States Parties in the implementation of the World Heritage Convention in the Arab States region along three main major axes : information, assistance, logistical & financial.

== History ==
The Arab Regional Centre for World Heritage was established by the Royal Decree issued on 16 December 2010, following the General Conference of UNESCO at its 35th session in 2009. The two legislative chambers ratified the agreement between UNESCO and the Government of Bahrain. The agreement following the decision of the General Conference (35th session) was signed in February 2010 by the Director-General of UNESCO, Irina Bokova and the Culture Minister of Bahrain Sh. Mai Bint Mohammed Al Khalifa.

As of 23 December 2011, all formalities related to the Agreement were completed upon the receipt of the letter of enforcement by UNESCO. Following the entry into force of the Agreement, the first meeting of the Governing Board was held on 28 April 2012 for the approval of the internal regulations, recruit the founding team of the Centre and approve the first year work plan.

== Activities ==
ARC-WH will organize its activities along three main axes:

1. The provision of information relating to the World Heritage Convention and its application, including development and management of an Arabic language website, the translation and publication of relevant documents, and promotion of the establishment of new conservation programmes at universities, in all the Arab region States.

2. The provision of assistance to States Parties in the region to improve their ability to implement the WH Convention (including understanding of WH policy, concepts, rules of procedure, preparation of tentative lists, preparation of nominations, monitoring of state of conservation, education programmes etc.) by facilitating organization of appropriate WH training at ARC-WH’s premises or anywhere else in the region, and responding to State Party requests for assistance.

3. The provision of logistical and financial support for regional activities in support of the WH Convention including hosting of meetings, conferences, training workshops or exhibitions in the region; the identification of appropriate facilities and services (lecture rooms, equipment, competent translators, etc.) for planned meetings for the WH Centre and other international institutions in the region, and the raising of funds to support World Heritage activities in the region.

== Related International Agencies ==
ARC-WH will meet its objectives in close coordination with existing international, regional and national agencies, initiatives and programmes concerned with World Heritage in the Arab States region including but not limited to:

• international organizations such as ICCROM (International Centre for the Study of the Preservation and Restoration of Cultural Property, and in particular, its ATHAR programme to “protect and promote the rich cultural heritage in the Arab region”; IUCN (International Union for Conservation of Nature); ICOMOS (International Council on Monuments and Sites)

• regional organizations such as ALECSO (The Arab League Educational, Cultural and Scientific Organization), Tunisia; ROPME (Regional Organisation for the Protection of the Marine Environment – Kuwait; UNEP, and PERSGA (Regional Organization for the Conservation of the Environment of the Red Sea and Gulf of Aden-Jeddah);

• national conservation agencies (the various Departments and Directorates of Antiquities in the region), and national conservation organisations such as CULTNAT (Centre for Documentation of Cultural and Natural Heritage), Egypt, affiliated with Bibliotheca Alexandrina and supported by the Ministry of Communications and Information Technology of Egypt), and CERKAS (Centre de Restauration et de Rehabilitation de zones atlasiques et sub-atlasiques), Morocco.
