= Graydon Henning =

Graydon Henning OAM (19 February 1936 – 23 October 2023) was an Australian economic historian at the University of New England in New South Wales, Australia for over thirty years.

He was a specialist in Australian economic history with a particular interest in maritime transport, business, and mining history, 1870–1914, and in the lumber trade of the Pacific Northwest, 1890–1914.

Henning was awarded a Medal of the Order of Australia (OAM) in the General Division in the King's Birthday 2024 Honours List for service to maritime history and to tertiary education.

Henning died on 23 October 2023, at the age of 87.

== Early life and education ==
Henning received a BEc. BA from the University of Adelaide and a Master of Arts degree from The University of Melbourne.

== Academic career ==
Henning taught economic history at the University of New England for thirty years before being named an honorary fellow. During this time he worked as the editor of the Australian Association for Maritime History's journal The Great Circle from 1989 to 1998, and was both a founding member and an honorary life member of the association.

Henning served as president of the International Commission for Maritime History from 2005 to 2016 when the commission merged with the International Maritime History Association. Prior to accepting the post, he had served as the vice-president of the commission, and had been a member of the editorial board for the International Journal of Maritime History.
