= Raymond Lemaire =

Canon Raymond Lemaire (1878–1954) was a professor at the Catholic University of Leuven, both student and successor of Joris Helleputte.

== Life ==
Lemaire was ordained to the priesthood in 1901 and graduated with a doctorate in Archaeology and Art History in 1906. From 1907 onwards he taught at the Catholic University of Leuven, at various times giving courses on ecclesiastical architecture, conservation, applied aesthetics and architectural history. He was particularly interested in Romanesque architecture in Belgium. He played an important role in debates about the reconstruction of Leuven after the extensive destruction wrought upon the city during the First World War. Canon Lemaire was the uncle of Baron Raymond M. Lemaire (1921-1997), who would follow him as titular of the chair of Architectural history and conservation of built heritage at the Catholic University of Leuven.

== Works ==
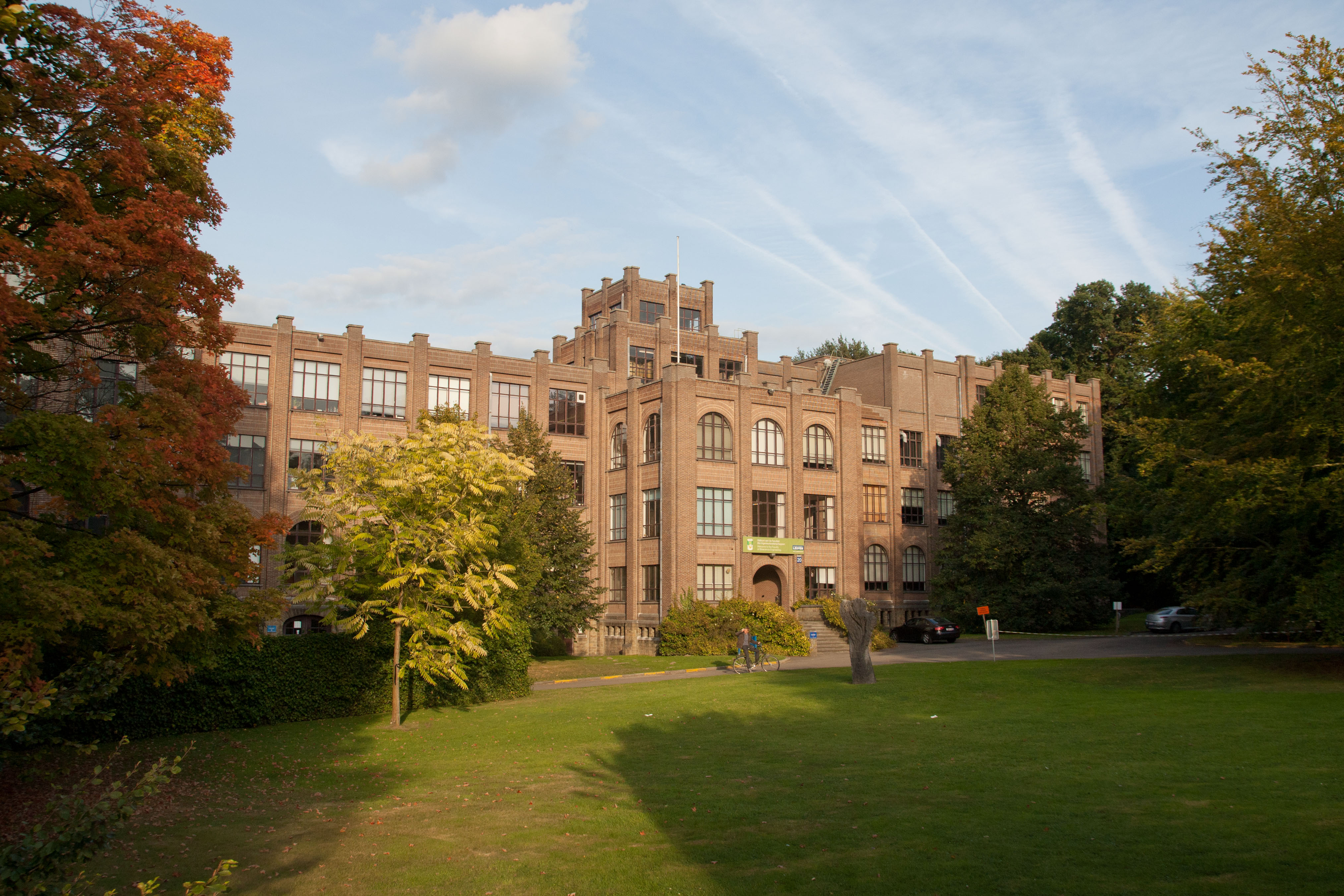
Institute of Agriculture, Heverlee

Even though he was not an architect, Lemaire designed several buildings including the church of the Redemptorists in Leuven (1926-28) and the Institute of Agriculture in Heverlee (1936-39). Among his conservation work of medieval churches, the St Anna's Chapel in Auderghem (1916-17) is a remarkable Romanesque stylistic restoration.

=== Publications ===
- Lemaire, Raymond, 1906. Les origines du style gothique en Brabant: L'architecture romane, Brussels: Vromant.
- Lemaire, Raymond, 1915. La reconstruction de Louvain: rapport présenté au nom de la Commission des alignements, Louvain: Wouters-Ickx.
- Lemaire, Raymond, 1918. Jezus goddelijk werkmanskind: retraite voor volksjongens: kenteekens der bouwwijze van de streek, Brussels: Vromant.
- Lemaire, Raymond, 1921. Het Laatste Avondmaal van Dierik Bouts: voordracht gehouden in de Sint-Pieterskerk op 7 november 1921, Leuven: Van Linthout.
- Lemaire, Raymond, 1922. De toestand der godsdienstige kunst, in: De Kunst en hare Toepassingen. Verzameling van platen der werken uitgevoerd door leden van de gilde der oud-leerlingen, St-Lucasschool Gent. Jaarboek, Ghent, p. xvii-xxviii.
- Lemaire, Raymond, 1931. Les études actuelles d'architecture et nos monuments anciens, Brussels: Heyvaert.
- Lemaire, Raymond, 1938. La restauration des monuments anciens, Antwerp: De Sikkel.
- Lemaire, Raymond, 1947. Beknopte geschiedenis van de meubelkunst, Antwerp: De Sikkel [several editions: 4th ed. 1947]
- Lemaire, Raymond, 1943. L'architecture du Moyen Age au pays de Namur, Namur: Dubois.
- Lemaire, Raymond, 1952. De Romaanse bouwkunst in de Nederlanden, Brussel: Verkandelingen van de Koninklijke Vlaamse Academie voor Wetenschappen, Letteren en Schone Kunsten van België.
- Lemaire, Raymond, 1954. De Romaanse bouwkunst in de Nederlanden, Leuven: Davidsfonds (Keurreeks, 54).
