= Webber Ndoro =

Zimbabwean archaeologist

- Occupation: Cultural Heritage
- Awards: 2015 ICCROM Award

Academic background
- Education: University of Zimbabwe; University of Cambridge; University of York; Uppsala University

Academic work
- Institutions: ICCROM

Webber Ndoro was the Director-General of ICCROM (the International Centre for the Study of the Preservation and Restoration of Cultural Property) from 2017 to 2023. He is considered the first professional Zimbabwean cultural heritage manager, and amongst the first trained Zimbabwean archaeologists.

== Early life and education ==
Webber was born in Goromonzi, Zimbabwe, in 1959, and grew up in the area of Domboshava .

Webber studied for a Bachelor of Arts degree at the University of Zimbabwe, 1980 to 1982, where he first encountered archaeology through the history courses he was studying. Subsequently, he studied for a MPhil in Archaeology at the University of Cambridge (1987), and then a M.A. in Architectural Conservation from the University of York (1990). He received a PhD in Heritage Management from Uppsala University.

== Career ==
In 1985, Ndoro joined the National Museums and Monuments of Zimbabwe. From 1992 to 1994 he was the co-coordinator of the museum's Monuments Programme. In 1994, he joined the University of Zimbabwe Archaeology Unit, where he lectured on heritage management and archaeology. He led the introduction of a Masters in Heritage Management in the early 2000s. Ndoro has also lectured on heritage management at the University of Bergen. Ndoro is an Honorary Professor at the University of Cape Town.

In 1998, Ndoro implemented one of the first site projects as part of ICCROM's AFRICA 2009 programme. In 2002, Ndoro joined the staff of ICRROM. In 2007, he became the Executive Director of the newly established African World Heritage Fund, where he developed the fund to become leading conservation organisation in Africa, undertaking work to coordinate the management of World Heritage Sites in Africa, improving Africa's World Heritage nominations, develop disaster risk management, and to encourage heritage entrepreneurship. His key heritage management work includes at Great Zimbabwe. Ndoro has made major contributions to the training of archaeologists and heritage managers across Africa.

He received the 2015 ICCROM Award, in recognition of his important contribution to the field of cultural heritage, and his contributions to the development of ICCROM.

Ndoro was appointed as the Director General of ICCROM in the period 2017-2023.

== Selected publications ==
Webber Ndoro and Gilbert Pwiti. 2005. Legal Frameworks for the Protection of Immovable Cultural Heritage in Africa. ICCROM conservation studies. Rome: ICCROM.

Webber Ndoro. 2005. The Preservation of Great Zimbabwe: your Monument our Shrine. ICCROM Conservation Studies 4. Rome: ICCROM.

Webber Ndoro. 2006. Building the capacity to protect heritage in rural communities, in N. Agnew & J. Bridgland (ed.) Of the past, for the future: integrating archaeology and conservation, proceedings of the conservation theme at the 5th World Archaeological Congress, Washington, D.C., 22–26 June 2003: 336–39. Los Angeles: The Getty Conservation Institute.

Webber Ndoro, Albert Mumma, George Abungu. 2008. Cultural Heritage and the Law: Protecting Immovable Heritage in sub-Saharan Africa Rome: ICCROM Conservation Studies 8.

Ndoro, W., & Kiriama, H. 2008. Management mechanisms in heritage legislation. In W. Ndoro, A. Mummaand, & G. Abungu (Eds.), Cultural heritage and the law: Protecting immovable heritage in sub-Saharan Africa (pp. 53–62). Rome: ICCROM Conservation Studies 8.
