= Frank Broeze =

Australian maritime historian (1945–2001)

- Born: 18 August 1945; Rijswijk, The Netherlands
- Died: 4 April 2001 (aged 55); Perth, Western Australia
- Occupation: Academic
- Years active: 1960s to 2001
- Known for: Maritime historian
- Notable work: Island nation; a history of Australians and the sea (1998)

Frank Broeze (18 August 1945 – 4 April 2001) was a professor of history at the University of Western Australia. His special area of interest was maritime history.

== Life and work ==
Born Franklin Jan Aart Broeze in Rijswijk, Netherlands, Broeze was a maritime historian, and one of the founders of the Australian Association for Maritime History. He was also one of the founders of the International Maritime History Association which later became the International Maritime Economic History Association. He published widely on maritime history issues as well as editing The Great Circle, the journal of the Australian Association for Maritime History. He wrote ten books and had more than 100 articles published in academic journals.

Although best known as a maritime historian he also wrote on economic history. For example, he is the main author of Chapter 5 Markets, in Australians 1838, one of ten volumes published to mark the Australian Bicentenary in 1988.

Broeze died on 4 April 2001 in Perth. The Frank Broeze Memorial Maritime History Book Prize was created by the Australian National Maritime Museum in his memory. In addition, a memorial lecture was inaugurated and is held each year.
