= Om Prakash Agrawal =

Indian conservationist (1931–2021)

Dr. Om Prakash Agrawal
- Born: 22 October 1931; India
- Died: 15 August 2021 (aged 89)
- Other name: Dr. O.P. Agrawal
- Occupation: Conservationist
- Known for: Art Conservation, Architectural Heritage Conservation
- Spouse: Usha Agrawal (m. 1955)
- Children: 2
- Family: Ajay Agrawal (son); Poonam Agarwal (daughter)
- Awards: Padma Shri; ICOM Award; ICCROM Award

Om Prakash Agrawal (22 October 1931 – 15 August 2021) was an Indian conservationist and the founder member of several organizations related to cultural heritage and conservation such as Indian National Trust for Art and Cultural Heritage (INTACH), Indian Council of Conservation Institute (ICCI) and the National Research Laboratory for the Conservation of Cultural Property (NRLC). He was the director general of INTACH Indian Conservation Institute and director general of ICCI and NRLC. The Government of India honoured him in 2011, with the award of Padma Shri, the fourth highest Indian civilian award for his contributions to the area of conservation.

== Biography ==
Om Prakash Agrawal, born on 22 October 1931, held a master's degree (MSc) in chemistry. He was one of the founders of the National Research Laboratory for Conservation of Cultural Property (NRLC), Lucknow in 1976 where he served as its director till 1985. During his stint there, he joined a group led by Pupul Jayakar and founded the Indian National Trust for Art and Cultural Heritage (INTACH) in 1984. It is reported that Agrawal played a part in the formation of the Indian Conservation Institute as an INTACH unit under the aegis National Mission for Manuscripts in 1985 and, after retiring from NRLC, joined the institute as its director general, a post he holds to the day. He is a former director general of the Indian Council of Conservation Institute (ICCI) and the incumbent president of the International Council of Biodeterioration of Cultural Property (ICBCP). He is also a former president of Museum Association of India and Indian Association for the Study of Conservation of Cultural Property.

Agrawal was an honorary fellow of the Indian Association for the Study of Conservation of Cultural Property (FIASC) and the International Institute of Conservation (FIIC). He also serves as a consultant to several international bodies such as UNESCO, International Centre for the Study of the Preservation and Restoration of Cultural Property (ICCROM), International Council of Museums (ICOM), and Southeast Asian Regional Centre for Archaeology and Fine Arts (SPAFA) and as a board member of the National Research Laboratory for the Conservation of Cultural Property (NRLC). He is the author over 200 articles and has published 37 books, either as an author or as an editor.

Agrawal, holder of the degree of DLitt (honoris Causa), was a recipient of ICOM award in 1990 and ICCROM award in 1993. The Government of India included him in the Republic Day honours list, in 2011, for the civilian award of Padma Shri. He was married to Usha Agrawal who was a director of programmes of the INTACH Indian Conservation Institute from 1991.

Om Prakash Agrawal died on 15 August 2021, at the age of 89.
