= Atle Thowsen =

Norwegian historian

Atle Thowsen (born 24 November 1940) is a historian and the Director of the Bergen Maritime Museum and served as president of the International Commission for Maritime History from 2000 to 2005.

== Early life and education ==
Born in 1940, Thowsen graduated from the University of Bergen in 1964 and received his doctor of philosophy degree in 1984 with a thesis on the shipping history of Bergen, 1914–1939.

== Career ==
Having worked at the Bergens Sjøfartsmuseum since 1964, being promoted to associate professor in 1968, he became the director of the museum and the Norsk sjøfartshistorisk forskningsfond in 1993. In addition, he is editor of Sjøfartshistorisk Årbok.

He contributed to the encyclopedia Norsk krigsleksikon 1940-45, where he wrote articles related to the Norwegian merchant fleet, Nortraship and naval ships.

== Published works ==
- Vekst og strukturendringer i krisetider 1914–1939, Bergen og Sjøfarten, (Bergen 1984)
- Den norske Krigsforsikring for Skib. Gjensidig forening 1935–1985, bind 1 (Bergen 1988)
- Nortraship: Profitt og patriotisme bind 1 i fembindsverket Handelsflåten i krig 1939–1945 (Oslo 1992)
- Fra krig til krise og vekst. Mellomkrigstiden – det store hamskiftet i Sørlandets skipsfart (Bergen 1995)
- The Underwriters follow the Fleet. From Norwegian Underwriters’ Agency to Scandinavian Marine Claims Office, Inc., 1897–1997 (Bergen and Stamford, CT 1998).

In addition, he has contributed to

- Statsmannaskap edited by Hans Lödén and P O Norell (2006)
