= Australian Association for Maritime History =

Maritime history organization in Australia

The Australian Association for Maritime History (AAMH) is an Australian maritime history organisation. It publishes a journal, a newsletter and organises conferences.

== History ==
The association was formed in May 1978. Its main aim is to promote the study, publication, and general appreciation of maritime history. The eminent American maritime historian John B. Hattendorf considers the AAMH one of the most prominent scholarly organisations in the English-speaking world and the late Professor Frank Broeze of the University of Western Australia considered that the creation of the AAMH contributed to a rising awareness of the significance of the role of the sea to Australian cultural history. The AAMH is not restricted to Australia and Australian maritime history: its membership and field of interest are international in scope. The AAMH is run by an Executive Council that has officers from all Australian States and Territories. It is currently (2018) based in Sydney.

The AAMH served as the Australian sub-commission of the International Commission for Maritime History until the ICMH merged with the International Economic Maritime History Association to form the International Maritime History Association in 2016. The AAMH also supports lectures, conferences, workshops, publications and book prizes.

== Maritime book prizes ==
The AAMH co-sponsors with the Australian National Maritime Museum the Frank Broeze Memorial Maritime History Prize, which is awarded for a book treating any aspect of maritime history relating to or impacting on Australia and the Australian Community Maritime History Prize awarded to a regional or local museum or historical society for a publication (book, booklet, educational resource kit, CD, DVD or other media) relating to an aspect of maritime history of that region or community.

The Frank Broeze Memorial Maritime History book prize is named in honour of the late Frank Broeze. Professor Broeze was a leading maritime historian and one of the founders of AAMH. He served as President of the Association in the 1980s and was the first editor of the Association's journal, The Great Circle.

The objective of the prizes is to promote a broad view of maritime history and the role of the sea and maritime influences in shaping Australia and its region; that is, the Indian, Pacific and Great Southern Oceans. The AAMH encourages this historical and archaeological approach of investigation and dissemination through its journal.

There are two categories: the Maritime History Book Prize for commercially published books and the Australian Community Maritime History Prize for works (books, DVDs, pamphlets etc.) by a locally based organisation.

== The Great Circle ==
The Great Circle is the journal of the Australian Association for Maritime History. The first issue was published in 1979. It is a refereed journal and is published twice a year. The journal is archived on JSTOR.

== Quarterly newsletter ==
The AAMH has a quarterly newsletter (named Quarterly newsletter) that was established by its first editor, Vaughan Evans (a founding member of the Association) in 1980, two years after the Association was founded. Both of these events came at a time when the field of maritime history was in its infancy in Australia. Recent back issues of the newsletters can be found on the Association's website.

== See also ==
- List of history awards
