= Bernard Feilden =

British conservation architect (1919–2008)

Sir Bernard Melchior Feilden CBE FRIBA (11 September 1919 – 14 November 2008) was a conservation architect whose work encompassed cathedrals, the Great Wall of China and the Taj Mahal.

== Education ==
Feilden was born in Hampstead, London. He was educated at Bedford School and The Bartlett School of Architecture, University College, London, completing his training at the Architectural Association after the second world war.

== Career ==
He joined the practice of Edward Boardman and Son in Norwich, where he designed the Trinity United Reformed Church. He set up an architectural practice, Feilden+Mawson, with David Mawson in 1956, to which offices in Norwich, London and Cambridge were later added. In 1968, Feilden took over as consultant architect to the University of East Anglia, completing the work of his predecessor Denys Lasdun, and creating an arena shaped square as a social space.

His work in Britain encompassed Norwich Cathedral, York Minster, St Paul's Cathedral, Hampton Court Palace and St Giles' Cathedral, Edinburgh. Overseas he advised on Jerusalem's Al-Aqsa mosque, the Taj Mahal, the Konark Sun Temple and the Great Wall of China.

From 1969 to 1977, he was Surveyor of the Fabric of St Paul's Cathedral.

He was elected Director of the International Centre for the Study of the Preservation and Restoration of Cultural Property (ICCROM) in 1977. During his mandate he spearheaded safeguarding measures and disaster recovery of cultural heritage in the wake of the 1976 earthquakes in Guatemala and Friuli (Italy), and the 1979 Montenegro earthquake.

His 1982 publication, Conservation of Historic Buildings is still an important reference book for architectural conservators.

In 1986 Feilden was awarded the Aga Khan Award for Architecture for his work on the Al-Aqsa mosque's dome. He was appointed OBE in 1969, CBE in 1976 and was knighted as a Knight Bachelor in 1985.

He died on 14 November 2008 at the age of 89.

National Life Stories conducted an oral history interview (C467/78) with Bernard Feilden in 2003-04 for its Architects Lives' collection held by the British Library.
