= Athens Charter (preservation) =

Manifesto on restoration of historic monuments

The Athens Charter for the Restoration of Historic Monuments is a seven-point manifesto adopted at the First International Congress of Architects and Technicians of Historic Monuments in Athens in 1931.

== Manifesto ==
The Athens Charter for the Restoration of Historic Monuments was produced by the participants of the First International Congress of Architects and Technicians of Historic Monuments. This congress was organized by the International Museums Office, taking place in Athens in 1931.

The seven points of the manifesto are:

1. to establish organizations for restoration advice
2. to ensure projects are reviewed with knowledgeable criticism
3. to establish national legislation to preserve historic sites
4. to rebury excavations which were not to be restored.
5. to allow the use of modern techniques and materials in restoration work.
6. to place historical sites under custodial protection.
7. to protect the area surrounding historic sites.

== See also ==
- Venice Charter – Charter for the Conservation and Restoration of Monuments and Sites
- Barcelona Charter – European Charter for the Conservation and Restoration of Traditional Ships in Operation
- Building restoration
- Historic preservation
