= Raymond M. Lemaire =

Belgian architect and scholar (1921–1997)

Raymond Martin Marie Ghislain, Baron Lemaire (Uccle, 28 May 1921 - Woluwe-Saint-Lambert, 13 August 1997) was an art historian and an architectural historian, a leading expert in conservation and professor at the Catholic University of Leuven and later at the KU Leuven and the Université catholique de Louvain in Louvain-la-Neuve.

== Family ==
Lemaire was a son of Herman Lemaire (1883-1947), architect in chief of the Belgian Ministry of Public Works, and of Marie-Henriette Winderyckx (*1892). He was a nephew of the distinguished architectural historian, built heritage conservationist, canon and professor Raymond Lemaire (1878-1954), from whom he was distinguished by his middle initial. In 1947, he married Christiane Vergaert (1924-2007) and they had four children.

On 25 July 1990, he was elevated into the Belgian hereditary nobility, with the personal title of baron. He took as his heraldic device: Virtus scientiam major.

== Studies and first activities ==
After his secondary studies at the Collège Saint-Pierre in Uccle, he studied at the Catholic University of Louvain, from 1938 to 1942. He graduated in law, history and art history. In 1948, he obtained a doctoral degree in Art History and Archaeology with a dissertation on the origins of Brabantine Gothic, Les origine du style gothique en Brabant. He worked with professor Stan Leurs (University of Ghent) and professor Ambrogio Anoni (Politecnico di Milano).

== Monuments Man ==
Volunteer after Belgium was liberated, he became captain in the First Armoured Car-regiment (Brigade Piron). From 1946 until 1949, with the title of plenipotentiary minister, he was a member of the Commission searching for stolen works of art. He was a liaison officer between the Belgian government and the allied services, the so-called Monuments Men. He coordinated the return to Belgium of thousands of looted works of art, books, archives and other items belonging to Belgian institutions and citizens.

== Academic career ==
Lemaire became assistant (1947), lecturer (1949) and professor (1953) at the Catholic University of Louvain. He lectured in de departments of art history and of engineering-architecture the courses of history of architecture, religious architecture, built heritage conservation, both in Dutch and in French, and continued to do so after the university had been split in two, along language lines. As a supervisor of Master’s theses and doctoral dissertations, Lemaire has supervised dozens of Belgian and international students.

In 1976, Lemaire founded within the College of Europe in Bruges a postgraduate "Centre for Conservation of Historic Towns and Buildings (CCHTB)" / "Centre d'études pour la conservation du patrimoine architectural et urbain". After five years, the CCHTB moved to Leuven and was fully integrated into the educational structure of the University of Leuven, Faculty of Engineering Science, attached to the Department of Architecture, Urban and Spatial Planning and, from 1993, also to the Department of Civil Engineering. Once retired in 1986, Lemaire continued to be actively involved as president of the CCHTB until his death in August 1997. After he passed away, the CCHTB adopted the name of its founder and first director: "Raymond Lemaire International Centre for Conservation" (RLICC) which still offers an advanced master of sciences degree, the "Master of Conservation of Monuments and Sites", to Belgian, international and interdisciplinary students.

== Activities in Belgium ==
His main activities were devoted towards architecture, built heritage conservation and restoration, as well as urban planning.

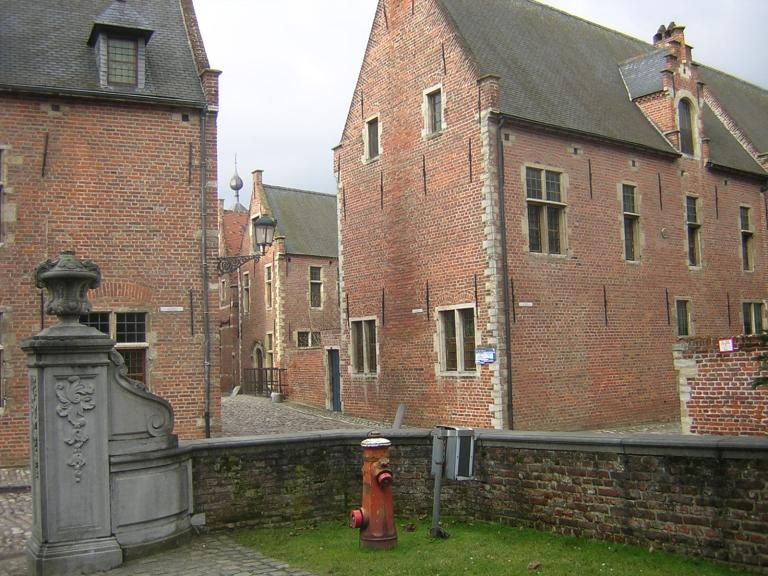
The Grand Béguinage in Leuven

He became renowned for the restoration of the Grand Béguinage in Leuven, 1964–71, where he put into practice the Venice Charter, of which he was the main editor. He was also one of the main designers of the new town of Louvain-la-Neuve whose concept was based on the structure of a historic traditional town. He was also involved in the planning of the UC Louvain medical campus at Woluwe-Saint-Lambert.

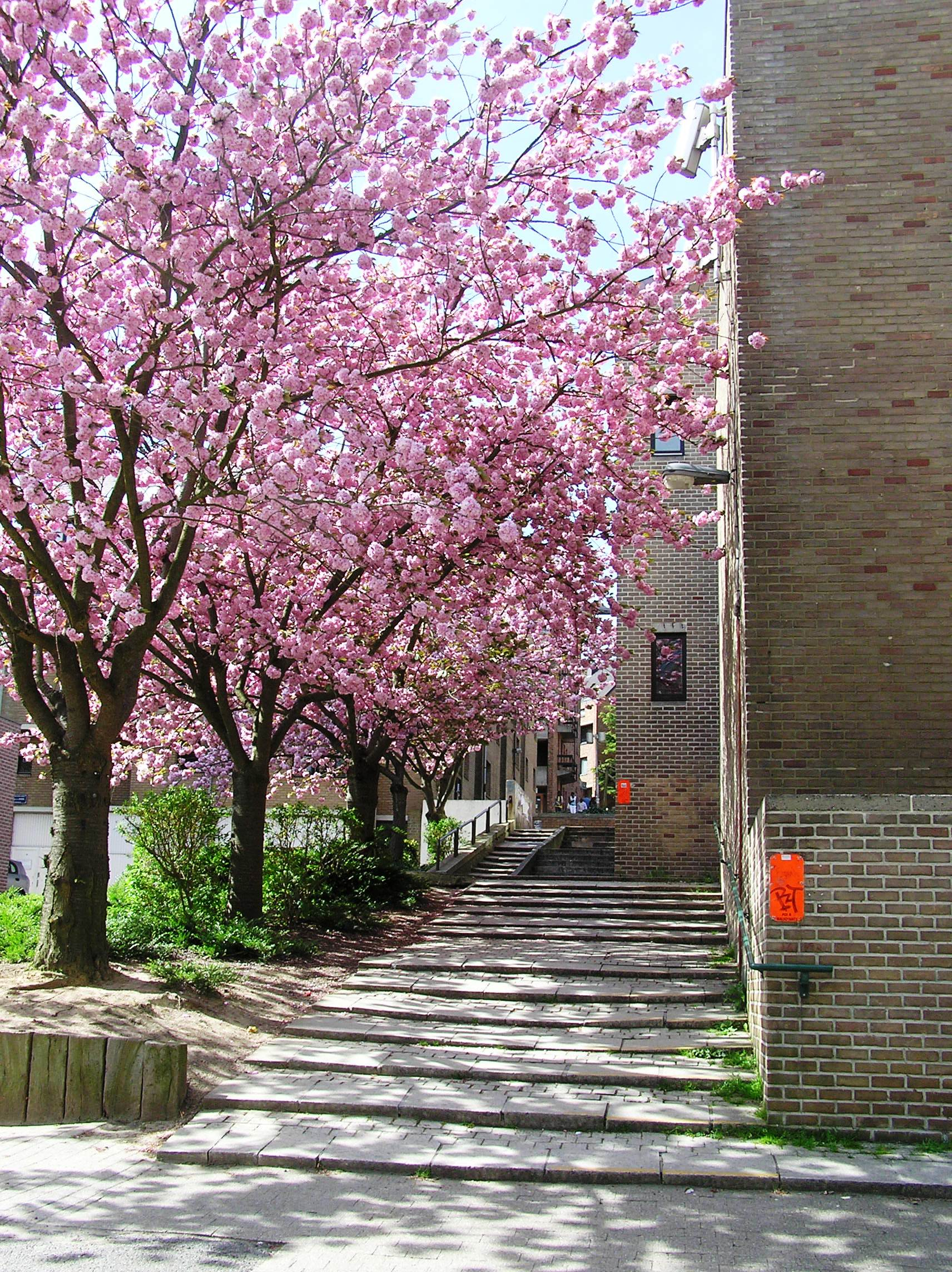
Escalier de l'Hocaille in Louvain-la-Neuve

These were not his only realizations. With regard to restorations, have to be mentioned:

- some thirty churches and chapels, including the St Lambert's Chapel in Heverlee, 1961–62, and the Romanesque churches of Tourinnes-la-Grosse, Bierbeek, Orp-le-Grand and Bertem
- a number of houses and country houses, including the Erasmus House in Anderlecht, 1986–87

From 1971 to 1977, he was counsel to the town of Bruges, more specifically for the historic town. Thanks to him, Bruges became one of the Belgian pilot-projects for the 1975 European Year of the architectural heritage. The master plan for the historic centre of bruges, by 'Groep Planning' and Raymond Lemaire, was published in 1976 and has been of great importance for Bruges as well as for urban preservtion and renovation in Belgium.

He took also part in other urban projects:

- rue des Brasseurs in Namur
- quartier des Arts in Brussels
- îlot Saint-Géry et Riches-Claires in Brussels, 1985–88
- projects in Courtrai, Mouscron, Villeneuve d'Ascq and Bergen-op-Zoom

He took also part in projects for new buildings, as designer or counsel, often in collaboration with the architects Robert Vandendael, Daniël Depoorter, Simon Brigode, Marc Dessauvage,

- Auditorium prof. Peeters [Auditorium De Molen] at the University of Leuven in Heverlee
- the church of Herne
- the metro station in Kraainem
- the church of Brasschaat
- his own house in Loonbeek

In 1966 he initiated the extensive series of books with the inventory of the Belgian architectural heritage wholse first volume was published in 1971, along a methodology which he developed. In 1997, the order of engineers and architects of Beirut edited the book entitled: Environnement et Patrimoine. Patrimoine et Lendemain.

== International activities ==
Lemaire was one of the main authors of the Venice Charter (1964). He was advisor to the European Union, the Council of Europe, and UNESCO.

With Piero Gazzola he founded in 1965 ICOMOS, the International Council for Monuments and Sites, an NGO linked with UNESCO. Lemaire was secretary-general (1965–75) and president (1975-81) of the organization. He founded the ICOMOS-periodical under the name Monumentum.

He attained international recognition thanks to his activities as an expert and counsellor for important restorations and numerous renovations. This was the case for his activities regarding the UNESCO World Heritage Sites of:

- temples of Borobodur (Indonesia)
- Acropolis in Athens
- Leaning Tower of Pisa
- churches in Romania
- historic town on Malta
- Jerash and Petra in Jordan
- Kasbah of Algiers

He was also the special envoy of the director general of UNESCO (1971–97) regarding the extremely difficult question of the Old City of Jerusalem.

== Honours ==
- 1977: Honorary doctor at the Faculté polytechnique de Mons
- 1978: Award Sir Abercrombie (Union Internationale des Architectes)
- 1970: Gold Medal of the Académie d'Architecture de France
- 1983: Gold medal for the Conservation and restoration of monuments (Hamburg)

== Sources ==
Most archives of Lemaire's office, including numerous architectural drawings and photos, constitute the Fonds Raymond Lemaire at the University Archive of KU Leuven.

- "Raymond Lemaire". ODIS.

== Publications ==
- Lemaire, R.M., 1949. Les origines du style gothique en Brabant, 2/1. La formation du style gothique brabançon. Les églises de l'ancien quartier de Louvain, Antwerp.
- Lemaire, R.M., 1957. L'architecture romane et gothique, in: L'art en Belgique du moyen âge à nos jours ed. by Paul Fierens, Brussels: Renaissance du Livre, p. 39-100.
- Lemaire, R.M., 1963. Bouwkunst, in Gids voor de Kunst in België, Utrecht/Antwerpen, 1963.
- Lemaire, R.M., 1978. Centre for the conservation of historic towns and buildings, Bruges.
- Lemaire, R.M. and Koen Van Balen (eds.), 1988. Stable – Unstable? Structural consolidation of ancient buildings, Leuven University Press.
- Lemaire, R.M., 1999, several articles collected in: Raymond Lemaire, ICOMOS - un regard en arrière, un coup d'oeil en avant, Liège: Commission royale des monuments, sites et fouilles, 195 p. (ISBN 2-87401-076-6).

== Literature ==
- Collective, 1998. Hommage au professeur Raymond Lemaire / Hulde aan professor Raymond Lemaire, special issue of ICOMOS Belgium, Leuven.
- Collective, 1999. Raymond Lemaire, ICOMOS - un regard en arrière, un coup d'oeil en avant, Liège: Commission royale des monuments, sites et fouilles.
- Houbart, Claudine, 2015. Raymond M. Lemaire (1921-1997) et la conservation de la ville ancienne: approche historique et critique de ses projets belges dans une perspective internationale, doctoral thesis (unpublished), KU Leuven.
- Houbart, Claudine, 2023. Du monument à la ville. Raymond M. Lemaire, expériences pionnières entre principes et pratiques, Liège: Presses universitaires de Liège.
- Houbart, Claudine, 2024. The Evolution of Urban Heritage Conservation and the Role of Raymond Lemaire, Routledge.
- Solar, Giora, 1997. Raymond Lemaire Remembered, Getty Conservation Institute Newsletter 12.3, Fall issue.
- Verpoest, Luc, 2015. Lemaire, Raymond Marie, in: Dictionnaire de l'architecture en Belgique de 1830 à nos jours, ed. Anne Van Loo, Antwerp: Mercatorfonds, p. 393–394.
- Verpoest, Luc, 2022. Raymond M. Lemaire 1921-1997: Verleden en toekomst van de historische stad als erfgoed, M&L. Monumenten, landschappen en archeologie, 41, p. 52-61.
- Woitrin, Michel, 2003. Raymond Lemaire, in: Nouvelle Biographie nationale, vol. 7, Brussels, 2003, col. 233-235 (ISSN 0776-3948).
