= Venice Charter =

International framework for the conservation of historic buildings

The Venice Charter for the Conservation and Restoration of Monuments and Sites
- Created: 31 May 1964
- Location: Venice, Italy
- Author: see: The Committee
- Purpose: Conservation and Restoration of the Monuments and Sites

The Venice Charter for the Conservation and Restoration of Monuments and Sites is a set of guidelines, drawn up in 1964 by a group of conservation professionals in Venice, that provides an international framework for the conservation and restoration of historic buildings. However, the document is now seen by some as outdated, representing Modernist views opposed to reconstruction. Reconstruction is now cautiously accepted by UNESCO in exceptional circumstances if it seeks to reflect a pattern of use or cultural practice that sustains cultural value, and is based on complete documentation without reliance on conjecture. The change in attitude can be marked by the reconstruction in 2015 of the Sufi mausoleums at the Timbuktu World Heritage Site in Mali after their destruction in 2012.

== Historic background ==
=== Athens Charter ===
The development of new conservation and restoration techniques have threatened the historic buildings in a general sense. In 1931, the International Museum Office organized a meeting of specialists about the conservation of historic buildings. The conference resulted with the Athens Charter for the Restoration of Historic Monuments. This consisted of a manifesto of seven points:

- to establish organizations for restoration advice
- to ensure projects are reviewed with knowledgeable criticism
- to establish national legislation to preserve historic sites
- to rebury excavations which were not to be restored.
- to allow the use of modern techniques and materials in restoration work.
- to place historical sites under custodial protection.
- to protect the area surrounding historic sites.

The Athens Charter proposed the idea of a common world heritage, the importance of the setting of monuments, and the principle of the integration of new materials. The Charter had very progressive suggestions for its period, influencing the creation of conservation institutions, as well as the eventual Venice Charter.

=== First International Congress of Architects and Specialists of Historic Buildings ===
With the concern that listing and safeguarding historic buildings was not enough, in 1957 architectural specialists arranged a congress in Paris called The First International Congress of Architects and Specialists of Historic Buildings. At its conclusion, the congress published seven recommendations:

1. the countries which still lack a central organization for the protection of historic buildings provide for the establishment of such an authority,
2. the creation of an international assembly of architects and specialists of historic buildings should be considered,
3. a specialized professional training of all categories of personnel should be promoted so as to secure highly qualified workmanship and that remuneration should be commensurate with such qualifications,
4. the hygrometric problems relating to historic buildings should be discussed in a symposium,
5. contemporary artists should be requested to contribute to the decoration of monuments,
6. close cooperation should be established among architects and archeologists,
7. architects and town-planners cooperate so as to secure integration of historic buildings into town planning.

The Congress agreed to have its second meeting in Venice and Piero Gazzola, who was to serve as the chairman of the Venice Charter, was invited to hold the Venice Congress.

=== Second International Congress of Architects and Specialists of Historic Buildings ===
In 1964, at the Second International Congress of Architects and Specialists of Historic Buildings, 13 resolutions were adopted of which the first was the Venice Charter and the second was creation of ICOMOS (International Council on Monuments and Sites).

The Venice Charter consisted of seven main titles and sixteen articles. The concept of historic monuments and sites was interpreted as the common heritage, therefore safeguarding them for future generations with authenticity being defined as the common responsibility. The following text is the original 1964 text agreed on by the representatives of the participating nations mentioned at the end of the Charter.

== Venice Charter Text ==
=== Definitions ===
Article 1. The concept of a historic monument embraces not only the single architectural work but also the urban or rural setting in which is found the evidence of a particular civilization, a significant development or a historic event. This applies not only to great works of art but also to more modest works of the past which have acquired cultural significance with the passing of time.

Article 2. The conservation and restoration of monuments must have recourse to all the sciences and techniques which can contribute to the study and safeguarding of the architectural heritage.

=== Aim ===
Article 3. The intention in conserving and restoring monuments is to safeguard them no less as works of art than as historical evidence.

=== Conservation ===
Article 4. It is essential to the conservation of monuments that they be maintained on a permanent basis.

Article 5. The conservation of monuments is always facilitated by making use of them for some socially useful purpose. Such use is therefore desirable but it must not change the lay-out or decoration of the building. It is within these limits only that modifications demanded by a change of function should be envisaged and may be permitted.

Article 6. The conservation of a monument implies preserving a setting which is not out of scale. Wherever the traditional setting exists, it must be kept. No new construction, demolition or modification which would alter the relations of mass and color must be allowed.

Article 7. A monument is inseparable from the history to which it bears witness and from the setting in which it occurs. The moving of all or part of a monument cannot be allowed except where the safeguarding of that monument demands it or where it is justified by national or international interest of paramount importance.

Article 8. Items of sculpture, painting or decoration which form an integral part of a monument may only be removed from it if this is the sole means of ensuring their preservation.

=== Restoration ===
Article 9. The process of restoration is a highly specialized operation. Its aim is to preserve and reveal the aesthetic and historic value of the monument and is based on respect for original material and authentic documents. It must stop at the point where conjecture begins, and in this case moreover any extra work which is indispensable must be distinct from the architectural composition and must bear a contemporary stamp. The restoration in any case must be preceded and followed by an archaeological and historical study of the monument.

Article 10. Where traditional techniques prove inadequate, the consolidation of a monument can be achieved by the use of any modern technique for conservation and construction, the efficacy of which has been shown by scientific data and proved by experience.

Article 11. The valid contributions of all periods to the building of a monument must be respected, since unity of style is not the aim of a restoration. When a building includes the superimposed work of different periods, the revealing of the underlying state can only be justified in exceptional circumstances and when what is removed is of little interest and the material which is brought to light is of great historical, archaeological or aesthetic value, and its state of preservation good enough to justify the action. Evaluation of the importance of the elements involved and the decision as to what may be destroyed cannot rest solely on the individual in charge of the work.

Article 12. Replacements of missing parts must integrate harmoniously with the whole, but at the same time must be distinguishable from the original so that restoration does not falsify the artistic or historic evidence.

Article 13. Additions cannot be allowed except in so far as they do not detract from the interesting parts of the building, its traditional setting, the balance of its composition and its relation with its surroundings.

=== Historic Sites ===
Article 14. The sites of monuments must be the object of special care in order to safeguard their integrity and ensure that they are cleared and presented in a seemly manner. The work of conservation and restoration carried out in such places should be inspired by the principles set forth in the foregoing articles.

=== Excavations ===
Article 15. Excavations should be carried out in accordance with scientific standards and the recommendation defining international principles to be applied in the case of archaeological excavation adopted by UNESCO in 1956. Ruins must be maintained and measures necessary for the permanent conservation and protection of architectural features and of objects discovered must be taken. Furthermore, every means must be taken to facilitate the understanding of the monument and to reveal it without ever distorting its meaning.

All reconstruction work should however be ruled out "a priori." Only anastylosis, that is to say, the reassembling of existing but dismembered parts can be permitted. The material used for integration should always be recognizable and its use should be the least that will ensure the conservation of a monument and the reinstatement of its form.

=== Publication ===
Article 16. In all works of preservation, restoration or excavation, there should always be precise documentation in the form of analytical and critical reports, illustrated with drawings and photographs. Every stage of the work of clearing, consolidation, rearrangement and integration, as well as technical and formal features identified during the course of the work, should be included. This record should be placed in the archives of a public institution and made available to research workers. It is recommended that the report should be published.

== The Committee ==
The following persons took part in the work of the Committee for drafting the International Charter for the Conservation and Restoration of Monuments:

- Piero Gazzola (Italy), Chairman
- Raymond M. Lemaire (Belgium), Reporter
- Jose Bassegoda-Nonell (Spain)
- Luis Benavente (Portugal)
- Djurdje Boskovic (Yugoslavia)
- Hiroshi Daifuku (UNESCO)
- P.L de Vrieze (Netherlands)
- Harald Langberg (Denmark)
- Mario Matteucci (Italy)
- Jean Merlet (France)
- Carlos Flores Marini (Mexico)
- Roberto Pane (Italy)
- S.C.J. Pavel (Czechoslovakia)
- Paul Philippot (ICCROM)
- Victor Pimentel (Peru)
- Harold Plenderleith (United Kingdom & ICCROM)
- Deoclecio Redig de Campos (Vatican)
- Jean Sonnier (France)
- Francois Sorlin (France)
- Eustathios Stikas (Greece)
- Mrs. Gertrud Tripp (Austria)
- Jan Zachwatowicz (Poland)
- Mustafa S. Zbiss (Tunisia)

== Outcome ==
The Venice Charter is the most influential document on conservation since 1964. However the following aspects are not covered in the Venice Charter:

- The concept of site which also applies to historic landscapes and gardens
- The concept of reversibility in restoration
- The social and financial issues

In the years after the publishing, the purpose of the charter a number of symposiums took place in order to improve common understandings and awareness of it by those involved in the conservation and restoration works of the historic buildings. How it was applied in different countries varied according to their social, economic and cultural conditions, as well as the technical qualifications of those applying it. Translation mistakes and misunderstandings of the Charter also led to differences in its application.

== Criticism ==
The Venice Charter and its subsequent interpretations have attracted criticism, especially by those who perceive it was built upon the Modernist biases of its creators. Professor of architecture Samir Younés has written: "The Charter’s abhorrence of restoration and reconstruction – with its implicit fear of "false history" – reflects the Modernist theory of historical determinism, rather than the idea of a living architectural tradition. Major advances over the last 40 years in traditional design fluency and building crafts skills have undercut and outmoded many of the assumptions implicit in the Venice Charter. As a result, many now believe that visual harmony, aesthetic balance and the essential character of a place are of greater importance than abstract Modernist theories."

Issue is taken particularly with the words in Article 9: "Any extra work which is indispensable must be distinct from the architectural composition and must bear a contemporary stamp." This declaration has had a major impact on the management of historic buildings globally. In the U.S., for example, it shaped the Secretary of the Interior’s Standard #9 so it stated "...new work shall be differentiated from the old". It has been commonly interpreted to mean that interventions and additions have to be in Modernist styles, rather than being discreetly indicated by such devices as dated cornerstones and descriptive plaques. Many popular reconstructions now considered intrinsic to their locations, such as the 1912 rebuilding of the Campanile di San Marco in Venice, would violate the Venice Charter’s dictum: “All reconstruction work should however be ruled out "a priori".

Because of concern over the damage being to historic settings by the Venice Charter's misapplication, in 2006 another conference was held in Venice under the auspices of INTBAU (the International Network for Traditional Building, Architecture & Urbanism). Its principal objective was to provide a theoretical framework that would enable new buildings and additions to be in greater harmony with their historic surroundings.

Critics of the Venice Charter point to the 2005 Charleston Charter as providing preferred guidelines for dealing with historic areas. It states: “New construction in historic settings, including alterations and additions to existing buildings, should not arbitrarily impose contrasting materials, scales, or design vocabularies, but clarify and extend the character of the place, seeking always continuity and wholeness in the built environment.”

== Revisions ==
Beginning with the World Heritage Convention (1972), some of the limited explanations in the Venice Charter were revised. The understanding of cultural heritage, which was expressed as historic monuments, was categorized as monuments, groups of buildings and sites. Later on The Nara Document on Authenticity (1994) carried out the responsibility to clarify the authenticity related issues which were expressed in the articles 6 and 7 of the Venice Charter.

In the Naples ICOMOS meeting on 7 November 1995; the question ‘Should there be a review of the Venice Charter?’ was discussed with participation of Raymond Lemaire, the reporter of the Venice Charter in 1964. Thirty years after the Venice Charter, Lemaire declared that: "Charters are fashionable. They are considered to contribute to directing action. However they never contain more than the minimum on which the majority has agreed. Only exceptionally do they cover the whole of the issue which concerns them. This is the case with the Venice Charter." He further stated his opinions about the present understanding of monuments and their restoration. He pointed out the necessity of a new document, or an effective adaptation, with consideration of the need "to be addressed with caution and wisdom, with respect for all cultures and above all with ethical and intellectual discipline."

The Venice Charter has itself become a historic document. While some of its guidelines are considered to have proven their worth by both its supporters and critics, there are now plans for it to be rewritten.

== Bibliography ==
- Hardy, Matthew The Venice Charter Revisited: Modernism, Conservation and Tradition in the 21st Century, foreword by HRH The Prince of Wales, Cambridge Scholars Publishing, Newcastle upon Tyne, UK; 2008, ISBN 1847186882
- Stubbs, John H. Time Honored: A Global View of Architectural Conservation, John Wiley & Sons; Hoboken, New Jersey; 2009

== See also ==
- International Council on Monuments and Sites
- Athens Charter
- Cultural heritage
- Building restoration
- Historic preservation
- Barcelona Charter – European Charter for the Conservation and Restoration of Traditional Ships in Operation
- Convention Concerning the Protection of the World Cultural and Natural Heritage (1972 World Heritage Convention)
