= World Heritage Committee =

Body selecting UNESCO World Heritage Sites

Logo of the UNESCO World Heritage Committee

The World Heritage Committee is a committee of the United Nations Educational, Scientific and Cultural Organization that selects the sites to be listed as UNESCO World Heritage Sites, including the World Heritage List and the List of World Heritage in Danger, defines the use of the World Heritage Fund and allocates financial assistance upon requests from States Parties. It comprises representatives from 21 state parties that are elected by the General Assembly of States Parties for a four-year term. These parties vote on decisions and proposals related to the World Heritage Convention and World Heritage List.

According to the World Heritage Convention, a committee member's term of office is six years. However many States Parties choose to voluntarily limit their term to four years, in order to give other States Parties an opportunity to serve. All members elected at the 15th General Assembly (2005) voluntarily chose to reduce their term of office from six to four years.

Deliberations of the World Heritage Committee are aided by three advisory bodies, the IUCN, ICOMOS and ICCROM.

== Sessions ==
The World Heritage Committee meets once a year for an ordinary session to discuss the management of existing World Heritage Sites, and accept nominations by countries. Extraordinary meetings can be convened at the request of two-thirds of the state members. Meetings are held within the territory of state members of the World Heritage Committee at their invitation. Rotation between regions and cultures is a consideration for selection and the location for the next session is chosen by the committee at the end of each session.

Session	Year	Date	Host city
1	1977	27 June – 1 July	(France) Paris
2	1978	5–8 September	(United States) Washington, D.C.
3	1979	22–26 October	(Egypt) Cairo & Luxor
4	1980	1–5 September	(France) Paris
5	1981	26–30 October	(Australia) Sydney
6	1982	13–17 December	(France) Paris
7	1983	5–9 December	(Italy) Florence
8	1984	29 October – 2 November	(Argentina) Buenos Aires
9	1985	2–6 December	(France) Paris
10	1986	24–28 November	(France) Paris
11	1987	7–11 December	(France) Paris
12	1988	5–9 December	(Brazil) Brasília
13	1989	11–15 December	(France) Paris
14	1990	7–12 December	(Canada) Banff
15	1991	9–13 December	(Tunisia) Carthage
16	1992	7–14 December	(United States) Santa Fe
17	1993	6–11 December	(Colombia) Cartagena
18	1994	12–17 December	(Thailand) Phuket
19	1995	4–9 December	(Germany) Berlin
20	1996	2–7 December	(Mexico) Mérida
21	1997	1–6 December	(Italy) Naples
22	1998	30 November – 5 December	(Japan) Kyoto
23	1999	29 November – 4 December	(Morocco) Marrakesh
24	2000	27 November – 2 December	(Australia) Cairns
25	2001	11–16 December	(Finland) Helsinki
26	2002	24–29 June	(Hungary) Budapest
27	2003	30 June – 5 July	(France) Paris
28	2004	28 June – 7 July	(China) Suzhou
29	2005	10–17 July	(South Africa) Durban
30	2006	8–16 July	(Lithuania) Vilnius
31	2007	23 June – 1 July	(New Zealand) Christchurch
32	2008	2–10 July	(Canada) Quebec City
33	2009	22–30 June	(Spain) Seville
34	2010	25 July – 3 August	(Brazil) Brasília
35	2011	19–29 June	(France) Paris
36	2012	25 June – 5 July	(Russia) Saint Petersburg
37	2013	17–27 June	(Cambodia) Phnom Penh
38	2014	15–15 June	(Qatar) Doha
39	2015	28 June – 8 July	(Germany) Bonn
40	2016	10–20 July	(Turkey) Istanbul
41	2017	2–12 July	(Poland) Kraków
42	2018	24 June – 4 July	(Bahrain) Manama
43	2019	30 June – 10 July	(Azerbaijan) Baku
44	2020–21	16–31 July 2021 (Note: Originally scheduled for 2020. Postponed to an extended 2021 session due to the COVID-19 pandemic.)	(China) Fuzhou
45	2022–23	10–25 September 2023 (Note: Originally scheduled for 19–30 June 2022 in Kazan, Russia. Postponed to an extended 2023 session due to the Russian invasion of Ukraine.)	(Saudi Arabia) Riyadh
46	2024	21–31 July	(India) New Delhi
47	2025	6–16 July	(France) Paris
48	2026	19–29 July	(South Korea) Busan
49	2027	June 27–July 7	(Turkey) Istanbul

== Bureau ==
At the end of each ordinary session, the committee elects a chairperson, five vice-chairpersons and a Rapporteur from those members whose term will continue through the next session. These are known as the Bureau, and their representatives are responsible for coordinating the work of the World Heritage Committee, including fixing dates, hours and the order of business meetings.

== Voting ==
Each state member of the World Heritage Committee has one vote. Decisions require a simple majority with abstentions counted as not voting. Votes are delivered by a show of hands unless a secret ballot is requested by either the chairperson or two or more states members.

== Members ==
Current members of the World Heritage Committee
Member state	Duration
Armenia	2025–2029
Azerbaijan	2025–2029
Bangladesh	2025–2029
Czech Republic	2025–2029
Grenada	2025–2029
Jamaica	2023–2027
Kazakhstan	2023–2027
Kenya	2023–2027
Kuwait	2025–2029
Lebanon	2023–2027
Mongolia	2025–2029
Peru	2025–2029
Poland	2025–2029
Senegal	2023–2027
South Korea	2023–2027
Switzerland	2025–2029
Tanzania	2025–2029
Togo	2025–2029
Turkey	2023–2027
Ukraine	2023–2027
Vietnam	2023–2027
Total	21

== Criticism ==
Increasing politicization of World Heritage Committee decisions to the detriment of conservation aims has been alleged, particularly with regard to new nominations for the World Heritage List, but also with the consideration of sites for the List of World Heritage in Danger. In 2010, states parties including Hungary, Switzerland and Zimbabwe submitted an official protest against such politicization.

An external audit requested by the World Heritage Committee for its Global Strategy of the World Heritage List concluded in 2011 that political considerations were indeed influencing decisions. It observed that the composition of committee representatives had shifted from experts to diplomats in spite of World Heritage Convention Article 9 and found that opinions from advisory bodies often diverged from World Heritage Committee decisions.

In 2016, Israel recalled its UNESCO ambassador after the World Heritage Committee adopted a resolution in a secret ballot that referred to one of Jerusalem's holiest sites, the Temple Mount, only as a "Muslim holy site of worship", not mentioning that Jews and Christians venerate the site.

The committee has also been criticized with alleged racism, colorism, and geographic bias for favoring the inscription of sites in Western and industrialized countries over sites belonging to so-called "third-world" countries. A large proportion of the world heritage sites are located in Europe, Eastern Asia, and North America, where populations notably have lighter skin.

== See also ==
- Lists of World Heritage Sites
- Operational Guidelines for the Implementation of the World Heritage Convention
