= International Commission for Maritime History =

The International Commission for Maritime History (ICMH) was established in 1960 to promote international cooperation and the exchange of ideas in the field of maritime history. It is affiliated with the International Committee of Historical Sciences.

== History ==
Founded as the Commission Internationale d’Histoire Maritime, (or CIHM), it was first organized at Lisbon, Portugal, on 14 September 1960. It is registered in Paris, France, as a non- profit “association étrangère selon le décret-loi du 12 avril 1939” and was authorised by the “Ministère de l’Intérieur” by “arrêté du 7 mai 1965” (See, Journal Officiel of 13 June 1965, p. 4936).

The International Commission for Maritime History is the successor organization to the International Commission for the History of Great Discoveries (ancienne Commission internationale pour l’histoire des grandes découvertes)

== Membership ==
Membership in the organisation is by national delegation. At present the following countries have national organizations as members:

- Australia Australian Association for Maritime History
- Canada Canadian Nautical Research Society | CNRS website
- Denmark The Committee for Danish Maritime History and Anthropology
- Finland
- France Sociéte française d'histoire maritime
- Germany Deutsche Seefahrtsgeschichtliche Kommission
- Great Britain British Commission for Maritime History
- The Netherlands
- Norway
- USA North American Society for Oceanic History

The following organisations have ICMH associate membership

- International Maritime Economic History Association (IMEHA)
- Association of the History of the Northern Seas (AHNS)

== Officials ==
The Secretariat is currently located at the Old Dominion University in Norfolk, VA, United States:

Prof. Dr. Ingo Heidbrink -Secretary General- International Commission for Maritime History c/o Department of History Old Dominion University 8000 Batten Arts & Letters Building Norfolk, VA 23529 USA

- President: Dr. Graydon Henning (Australia)
- Immediate past president: Dr. Atle Thowsen (Norway)
- Vice-presidents: Dr. Tapio Bergholm (Finland), Dr. William Glover (Canada), Prof. John Hattendorf (United States)
- Secretary General: Prof. Dr. Ingo Heidbrink (Germany / United States)
- Treasurer: Dr. Mary Ellen Condon-Rall (United States)
