= Riga Charter =

The Riga Charter on Authenticity and Historical Reconstruction in Relationship to Cultural Heritage, known simply as the Riga Charter, is an international charter or a statement of the scope, objectives and participants in cultural heritage projects, which guides the conservation, restoration, maintenance, repair and use of historic railway equipment, which can still be operated.

The charter was adopted at Riga in Latvia on 23 and 24 October 2000 at the Regional Conference on Authenticity and Historical Reconstruction in Relationship to Cultural Heritage, initiated by ICCROM The Riga Charter was composed by a scientific committee organised for that purpose during the Riga meeting.

== Application ==
- The Riga Charter was adopted by FEDECRAIL (European Federation of Museum & Tourist Railways) at their Annual Meeting held at Anse, near Lyon on 16 April 2005
