= International Council on Monuments and Sites =

French cultural heritage organization

- Founded: 1965; 61 years ago
- Type: Professional Body
- Location: Paris, France
- Services: Conservation and protection of cultural heritage places around the world
- Key people: Grainne Shaffrey (President); Mariana Pereira (Secretary General); Cyrill von Planta (Treasurer General)
- Website: www.icomos.org

The International Council on Monuments and Sites (ICOMOS; French: Conseil international des monuments et des sites) is a professional association that works for the conservation and protection of cultural heritage places around the world. Now headquartered in Charenton-le-Pont, France, ICOMOS was founded in 1965 in Warsaw as a result of the Venice Charter of 1964 and offers advice to UNESCO on World Heritage Sites.

The idea behind ICOMOS dates to the Athens Conference on the restoration of historic buildings in 1931, organized by the International Museums Office. The Athens Charter of 1931 introduced the concept of international heritage. In 1964, the Second Congress of Architects and Specialists of Historic Buildings, meeting in Venice, adopted 13 resolutions. The first created the International Charter on the Conservation and Restoration of Monuments and Sites, better known as Venice Charter; the second, put forward by UNESCO, created ICOMOS to carry out this charter.

As of 2026, ICOMOS has over 12,000 individual members in over 130 countries and territories, 110 national committees, and over 30 international scientific committees. With rare exceptions, each member must be qualified in the field of conservation and a practicing landscape architect, architect, archaeologist, anthropologist, town planner, engineer, administrator of heritage, historian, art historian, palaeontologist or archivist.

ICOMOS is a partner and founding member of the Blue Shield, which works to protect the world's cultural heritage threatened by war and natural disasters.

== ICOMOS structure ==
ICOMOS is composed of its national committees (NCs), to which individuals and institutions apply for membership. In addition to the national committees, ICOMOS has a series of international scientific committees (ISCs), in which experts in a certain field of activity within the context of heritage conservation exchange views and debate.

The organization is headed by a president, five vice-presidents, a secretary-general and a treasurer all directly elected by the general assembly of the organization. Twelve additional members are also elected by the General Assembly into the Executive Committee and five further members are co-opted into the executive board in order to represent regions of the world or areas of expertise that were not part of the executive committee following the elections. Ex officio members of the executive committee are the president of the advisory committee and the previous presidents of ICOMOS, who attend in advisory capacity. The executive committee is the executive body of ICOMOS.

The advisory committee is composed of the chairpersons of the national committees, the presidents/chairpersons of the international scientific committees and the president of ICOMOS as an ex officio member. The advisory committee was given the task to advise and make recommendations to the General Assembly and the Executive Committee on matters which concern policy and programme priorities.

=== National Committees ===
National Committees are subsidiary organizations created in the countries which are members of UNESCO. They bring together individual and institutional members and offer them a framework for discussion and an exchange of information. Each national committee adopts its own rules of procedure and elaborates its own program according to the goals and aims of ICOMOS. In 2021, ICOMOS has 107 national committees. ICOMOS website includes a list regularly updated.

=== International Scientific Committees ===
International Scientific Committees (ISCs) are entities focus on specialised areas of heritage conservation and are made up of members of the organisation drawn from those specialist areas. The scientific programmes of the organisation are coordinated by the "scientific council" made up of the presidents of the ISCs. In 2026, ICOMOS had over 30 ISCs. A list regularly updated is available on ICOMOS website.

=== Working groups ===
ICOMOS leads efforts worldwide to advance knowledge and practice in cultural heritage protection, conservation and restoration. In order to address emerging priorities and key topics that involve many, or all, International Scientific Committees, ICOMOS have set up working groups. These working groups bring together different ICOMOS members and heritage professionals: architects, archaeologists, professors and researchers, curators and scientists. The aim of these groups can be the drafting of a charter, the implementation of concrete activities (working sessions, workshops). There are currently five working groups, the list of which can be found on the ICOMOS website .

== Documentation ==
ICOMOS' documentation center is located at the association's headquarters in Greater Paris. It is a major resource on cultural heritage, original documents on cultural and Mixed (natural and cultural) World Heritage properties, and it collects, analyses and disseminates information on all methods of heritage conservation, especially through its bibliographic database (+80,000 references) and its graphic documents database (+40,000 references).

== Publications ==
ICOMOS International publishes on a regular basis ICOMOS News (newsletter for members, quarterly in French, English, Spanish) and the ICOMOS Scientific Journal (published twice a year). ICOMOS France regularly publishes Le Bulletin d’information d’Icomos France, Les Cahiers de la Section Française de l’ICOMOS, Les Dossiers techniques, Les Mémentos techniques, les Bulletins, and Les Enquêtes de la section française.

== Charters and doctrines ==
ICOMOS has developed and adopted a number of other charters and doctrinal texts which provide guidance to heritage conservation professionals. Those documents are created by the international committees of the organisation or a Working Group established to address the issue, and are then adopted by the triennial General Assembly. Each text addresses a specific area of professional practice of heritage conservation. Those charters and other doctrinal texts include:

Year	Name	Description	Sources
1964	Venice Charter	International charter for the conservation and restoration of monuments and sites	
1982	Florence Charter	Conservation of historic gardens (International Committee on Historic Gardens)	
1987	Washington Charter	Charter for the conservation of historic towns and urban areas. Superseded by the 2011 Valletta principles below.	
1990	Charter for the Protection and Management of Archaeological Heritage		
1994	Nara Document on Authenticity	Broader understanding of cultural diversity and cultural heritage in conservation efforts	
1996	Charter on the Protection and Management of Underwater Cultural Heritage		
1999	International Cultural Tourism Charter	Managing tourism at places of heritage significance	
1999	Principles for the Preservation of Timber Structures		
1999	Charter on the Built Vernacular Heritage		
2003	Principles for the Analysis, Conservation and Structural Restoration of Architectural Heritage		
2003	Principles for the Preservation and Conservation -Restoration of Wall Paintings		
2008	Charter on Cultural Routes		
2008	Ename Charter	Charter for the interpretation and presentation of cultural heritage sites	
2011	Principles for the Conservation of Industrial Heritage Sites, Structures, Areas and Landscapes	Joint ICOMOS-TICCIH principles	
2011	The Valletta Principles for the Safeguarding and Management of Historic Cities, Towns and Urban Areas	Supersedes the 1987 Washington Charter above	
2017	Principles Concerning Rural Landscapes as Heritage	ICOMOS-IFLA International Scientific Committee on Cultural Landscapes	
2017	Document on Historic Urban Public Parks	ICOMOS-IFLA International Scientific Committee on Cultural Landscapes	
2017	Salalah Guidelines for the Management of Public Archaeological Sites		
2017	Principles for the Conservation of Wooden-Built Heritage		

Many of the national committees of ICOMOS have adopted their own charters which set standards for heritage conservation practice at national level.

== ICOMOS and the World Heritage Convention ==
In 1972, ICOMOS was named by the UNESCO World Heritage Convention as one of the three formal advisory bodies to the World Heritage Committee, along with the International Union for Conservation of Nature (IUCN) and the International Centre for the Study of the Preservation and Restoration of Cultural Property (ICCROM). As the professional and scientific adviser to the committee on all aspects of the cultural heritage, ICOMOS is responsible for the evaluation of all nominations of cultural properties made to the World Heritage List with the criteria laid down by the World Heritage Committee. In addition to the basic criterion of “outstanding universal value,” ICOMOS evaluates nominations for aspects related to authenticity, management, and conservation as specified in the World Heritage Convention.

The evaluation of nominations involves consultation between the wide-ranging expertise represented by the organization’s membership and its national and scientific committees. Members are also sent on expert missions to carry out on-site evaluations of nominated properties. This extensive consultation results in the preparation of detailed recommendations that are submitted to the World Heritage Committee at its annual meetings.

ICOMOS is also involved, through its International Secretariat and its national and scientific committees, in the preparation of reports on the state of conservation of properties inscribed on the World Heritage List. It advises the UNESCO World Heritage Centre on requests for technical assistance received from states that are party to (i.e. have ratified) the World Heritage Convention. ICOMOS maintains a full archive of nominations and reports at the documentation centre at its Paris headquarters.

== Piero Gazzola award ==
The Gazzola Prize was established in 1979 in memory of Piero Gazzola, one of the greatest defenders of the conservation and restoration of historic monuments and sites, and a founder of ICOMOS. The prize is awarded every three years at the General Assembly of ICOMOS to an individual or a group of people who have worked together and contributed with distinction to the aims and objectives of ICOMOS. The beneficiary must be a member of ICOMOS and is chosen by the Selection Committee itself elected by the ICOMOS Board. The Prize is a commemorative medal and diploma.

=== List of awardees ===
- 1981 – Jean Trouvelot
- 1984 – Stanisław Lorentz
- 1987 – Masuru Sekino
- 1990 – Gertrud Tripp
- 1993 – Bernard Feilden
- 1996 – Ernest Allan Connally
- 1999 – Roland Silva
- 2002 – Cevat Erder
- 2005 – Ann Webster Smith
- 2008 – Carmen Añón Feliu
- 2011 – Nobuo Ito
- 2014 – Henry Cleere
- 2017 – Saleh Lamei Mostafa
- 2020 – Amund Sinding-Larsen

== List of ICOMOS General Assemblies, Presidents and Secretaries General ==
ICOMOS General Assemblies, Presidents & Secretaries General
Nr.	Time	General Assembly		Term	President		Secretary General	
22.	2026	Kuching	Malaysia	2023–2026	Grainne Shaffrey	Ireland	Mariana Pereira	Portugal
21.	2023	Sydney	Australia	2023–2026	Teresa Patricio	Belgium	Jurn Buisman	Netherlands
20.	2020	Online (due to the COVID-19 pandemic)		2020–2023	Teresa Patricio	Belgium	Mario Santana	Canada
19.	2017	Delhi	India	2017–2020	Toshiyuki Kono	Japan	Peter Phillips	Australia
18.	2014	Florence	Italy	2014–2017	Gustavo Araoz	United States	Kirsti Kovanen	Finland
17.	2011	Paris	France	2011–2014	Gustavo Araoz	United States	Kirsti Kovanen	Finland
16.	2008	Québec	Canada	2008–2011	Gustavo Araoz	United States	Bénédicte Selfslagh	Belgium
15.	2005	Xi'an	China	2005–2008	Michael Petzet	Germany	Dinu Bumbaru	Canada
14.	2003	Victoria Falls	Zimbabwe					
13.	2002	Madrid	Spain	2002–2005	Michael Petzet	Germany	Dinu Bumbaru	Canada
12.	1999	Mexico City	Mexico	1999–2002	Michael Petzet	Germany	Jean-Louis Luxen	Belgium
11.	1996	Sofia	Bulgaria	1996–1999	Roland Silva	Sri Lanka	Jean-Louis Luxen	Belgium
10.	1993	Colombo	Sri Lanka	1993–1996	Roland Silva	Sri Lanka	Jean-Louis Luxen	Belgium
9.	1990	Lausanne	Switzerland	1990–1993	Roland Silva	Sri Lanka	Herb Stovel	Canada
8.	1987	Washington, D.C.	United States	1987–1990	Roberto di Stefano	Italy	Helmut Stelzer	East Germany
7.	1984	Rostock	East Germany	1984–1987	Michel Parent	France	Abdelaziz Daoulatli	Tunisia
6.	1981	Rome	Italy	1981–1984	Michel Parent	France	Abdelaziz Daoulatli	Tunisia
5.	1978	Moscow	Soviet Union	1978–1981	Raymond M. Lemaire	Belgium	Ernest Allen Connaly	United States
4.	1975	Rothenburg ob der Tauber	Germany	1975–1978	Raymond M. Lemaire	Belgium	Ernest Allen Connaly	United States
3.	1972	Budapest	Hungary	1972–1975	Piero Gazzola	Italy	Raymond M. Lemaire	Belgium
2.	1969	Oxford	United Kingdom	1969–1972	Piero Gazzola	Italy	Raymond M. Lemaire	Belgium
1.	1965	Kraków	Poland	1965–1969	Piero Gazzola	Italy	Raymond M. Lemaire	Belgium

== See also ==
- International Day For Monuments and Sites
