= International Centre for the Study of the Preservation and Restoration of Cultural Property =

Culture heritage organization

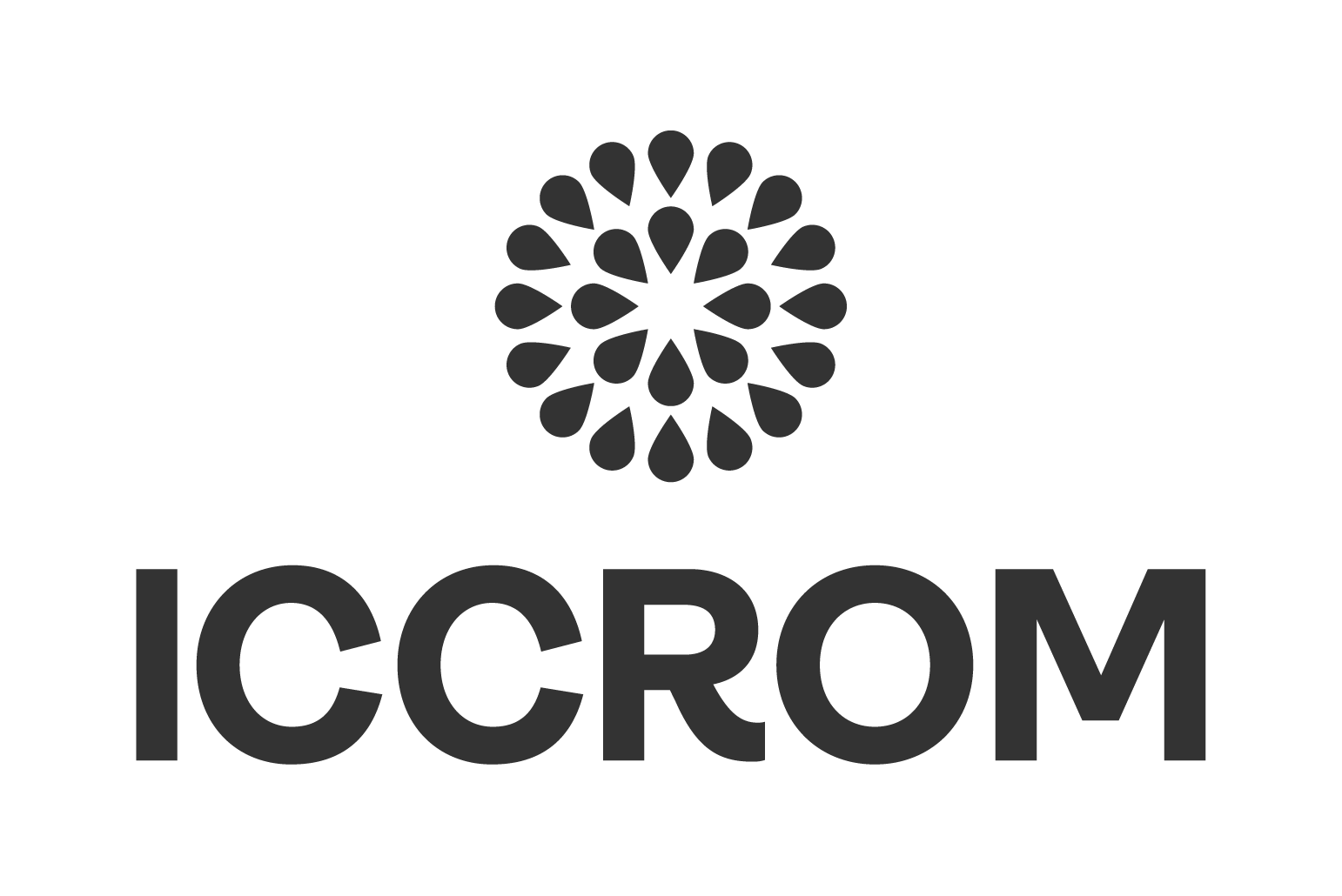
- Abbreviation: ICCROM
- Formation: 1956
- Type: Intergovernmental Organization (IGO)
- Purpose: Conservation-restoration
- Headquarters: Rome, Italy
- Location: Via di San Michele 13, 00153 Rome, Italy
- Region served: Worldwide
- Members: 139 Member States
- Official language: English, French
- Director-General: Aruna Francesca Maria Gujral
- Website: www.iccrom.org

The International Centre for the Study of the Preservation and Restoration of Cultural Property (ICCROM) is an intergovernmental organization dedicated to the preservation of cultural heritage worldwide through training, information, research, cooperation and advocacy programmes. It aims to enhance the field of conservation-restoration and raise awareness to the importance and fragility of cultural heritage.

The creation of the Centre took place as a result of a proposal at the UNESCO General Conference held in New Delhi, India, in 1956. Three years later, the centre was established in Rome, Italy, where its headquarters are to this day. In 2012, ICCROM Regional Centre in Sharjah (United Arab Emirates) has opened.

As of 2026, ICCROM has 139 member states.

== Mission ==
ICCROM's mission is defined by a set of statutes that were drafted shortly before its establishment (and revised on 25 November 2009).

Article 1, Purpose and functions

The 'International Centre for the Study of the Preservation and Restoration of Cultural Property', hereinafter called 'ICCROM', shall contribute to the worldwide conservation and restoration of cultural property by initiating, developing, promoting and facilitating conditions for such conservation and restoration. ICCROM shall exercise, in particular, the following functions:

1. collect, study and circulate information concerned with scientific, technical and ethical issues relating to the conservation and restoration of cultural property;
2. coordinate, stimulate or institute research in this domain by means, in particular, of assignments entrusted to bodies or experts, international meetings, publications and the exchange of specialists;
3. give advice and make recommendations on general or specific questions relating to the conservation and restoration of cultural property;
4. promote, develop and provide training relating to the conservation and restoration of cultural property and raise the standards and practice of conservation and restoration work;
5. encourage initiatives that create a better understanding of the conservation and restoration of cultural property.

=== Activities ===
ICCROM's mission is fulfilled through five areas of activity: training, information, research, cooperation and advocacy.

==== Training ====
ICCROM contributes to capacity building through the development of educational materials, training activities worldwide, internships and fellows. Since 1965, ICCROM has offered courses to mid-career professionals on a wide range of topics that include archaeological site conservation, architectural records and inventories, built heritage conservation, conservation decision making, cultural heritage management, preventive conservation in museums and risk management to endangered collections. Other courses are focused on specific materials such as stone, wood, or sound and image collections, and others still focus on the conservation of heritage in specific regional areas, such as the Arab region or Southeast Asia.

==== Information ====
The ICCROM library is one of the world's leading sources of information on the conservation and restoration of cultural heritage. It contains more than 115,000 registered references and 1,800 specialized journals in more than 60 languages. In addition, the archive contains institutional records that date back to ICCROM's creation, as well as over 200,000 images of cultural heritage worldwide in relation to ICCROM's scientific and educational activities. The website is a portal to comprehensive information about courses, activities, international events, and employment and training opportunities in the conservation field.

==== Research ====
ICCROM facilitates a vast network of conservation professionals and institutions through which it organizes and coordinates meetings to devise common approaches and methodologies. It also promotes the definition of internationally agreed ethics, criteria and technical standards for conservation practice. The in-house laboratory is also a reference point and resource for professionals, course participants, interns and fellows of the organization.

==== Cooperation ====
ICCROM carries out all of its activities in collaboration with a vast number of institutional and professional partners. Additionally, it serves its Member States in the form of collaborative projects, training, and technical advice.

==== Advocacy ====
ICCROM disseminates teaching materials and organizes workshops and conferences to raise public awareness and support for conservation.

== History ==
The end of the Second World War came with the need to repair monuments and other forms of cultural heritage that had been either damaged or destroyed. At the same time, other countries were emerging from colonization and were eager to industrialize, reclaim and redefine their cultural identity, and train personnel to preserve their heritage.

On an international level, there was a lack of cohesive training and authoritative bodies to guide countries in rebuilding and protecting their heritage. Thus, during the Sixth Session of the UNESCO General Conference (1951), the Swiss government introduced a resolution that proposed the establishment of an international centre to encourage the study and awareness of methods of conservation on a global scale. This was adopted and a committee of experts were put together to decide upon the role and functions of this institution. In the centre's ten-year anniversary commemorative booklet ("The First Decade 1959-1969", pp. 12–13), Hiroshi Daifuku of the Section for the Development of the Cultural Heritage (UNESCO) explained,

Mr. Georges Henri Rivière (then Director of ICOM) was appointed chairman of a sub-committee of the International Committee for Monuments of UNESCO for the creation of the Centre. The members of this Committee, when discussing the proposed functions of the Centre (September 25, 1953), considered that such a body could, for example:

1. treat major problems involved in conservation, such as lighting;
2. call upon a wide range of specialists from different countries;
3. provide information to countries which lack laboratories;
4. treat problems concerned with the preservation of monuments;
5. coordinate research and having a stronger moral authority eventually prevent badly trained conservators from undertaking restoration of important works of art.

These functions would become the template for the centre's statutes.

In 1956 the resolution was adopted at the Ninth Session of the UNESCO General Conference in New Delhi and in 1957, an agreement was signed between the Government of the Italian Republic and UNESCO to establish this Centre in Rome.

The adhesion of five Member States by 1958 allowed the Statutes to come into force, making the centre a legal entity. Collaboration was established with other European conservation institutions, namely the Central Institute of Restoration of Italy (ICR, now ISCR) and the Royal Institute for Restoration of Works of Art (IRPA) in Belgium. A provisional council nominated by UNESCO was created to govern the Centre and in 1959, it opened in Rome with Harold J. Plenderleith, renowned Keeper at the British Museum, as its director. The Belgian art historian, Paul Philippot was appointed deputy director and the first General Assembly took place in 1960 during which the first regular Council Members were elected.

=== Timeline ===
Below is a timeline of key events in the centre's development:

- 1956 – UNESCO General Conference decides to establish a conservation body.
- 1957 – Agreement is signed between UNESCO and Italy to establish the Centre in Rome. Austria becomes the first Member State.
- 1958 – Five Member States Adhere, making the centre a legal entity.
- 1959 – The Rome Centre becomes operational with Plenderleith as its first director.
- 1960 – The first General Assembly is held.
- 1961 – The library is launched and becomes a leading source of conservation literature.
- 1964 – The centre is involved in the drafting of the Venice Charter as well as salvaging the monuments of the Nile Valley, including the Temples of Abu Simbel.
- 1965 – The first course on Architectural Conservation (ARC) is held.
- 1966 – ICCROM coordinates the first international response to the floods in Florence and Venice.
- 1968 – The first course on the Conservation of Mural Paintings (MPC) is held.
- 1971 – Paul Philippot is appointed Director and changes the name from “Rome Centre” to “International Centre for Conservation”.
- 1972 – UNESCO acknowledges the centre as an advisory body of the World Heritage Convention.
- 1973 – The first course on Conservation Science (SPC) is held.
- 1975 – The first course on Preventive Conservation in Museums is held.
- 1976 – The first course on Stone Conservation in Venice is held. Recovery work is done in the wake of the earthquake in Friuli, Italy.
- 1977 – Bernard M. Feilden is appointed Director, changes the centre's name to ICCROM.
- 1981 – Turkish Archaeologist Cevat Erder becomes Director.
- 1982 – The Technical Assistance Programme is launched, initially providing minor equipment and supplies, didactic material, conservation literature, annual subscriptions to conservation periodicals and photocopies to public institutions and non-profit organizations.
- 1985 – Regional Programmes were launched with the PREMA programme (PREvention of Museums in Africa), a long-term incentive to train sub-Saharan African professionals in preventive conservation.
- 1986 – ICCROM wins the Aga Khan Award for Architecture for the conservation of the Al-Aqsa Mosque in Jerusalem.
- 1988 – Polish architect Andrzej Tomaszewski is appointed Director. First course on Wood Conservation is held in Trondheim, Norway.
- 1991 – The Media Save Art campaign begins; its objective is to raise awareness among school children regarding the fragility of cultural heritage.
- 1992 – Marc Laenen, Belgian museum director and art historian is appointed Director-General.
- 1993 – The NAMEC Programme for conservation training in Maghreb countries begins. ICCROM's statutory functions are revised to include advocacy.
- 1994 – ICCROM goes online. The PREMO Programme for conservation in the Pacific is launched. The Nara Document on Authenticity is drafted in Japan.
- 1995 – The Integrated Territorial and Urban Conservation (ITUC) Project begins.
- 1996 – The first PAT (Pan American Course on the Conservation and Management of Earthen Architectural and Archeological Heritage) is held at the archaeological site Chan Chan in Trujillo, Peru.
- 1997 – The Dr. Harold J. Plenderleith Laboratory is inaugurated at ICCROM.
- 1998 – The AFRICA 2009 Programme is launched, offering training courses on the conservation of immovable heritage in sub-Saharan Africa. An agreement is also signed between ICCROM and the National University of Benin, creating EPA (Ecole du Patrimoine Africain).
- 1999 – The first Conservation of Urushi (Japanese lacquer) course takes place.
- 2000 – Riga Charter adopted at Riga in Latvia on 23 and 24 October 2000 at the Regional Conference on Authenticity and Historical Reconstruction in Relationship to Cultural Heritage, initiated by ICCROM
- 2000 – British archaeologist and conservation educator, Nicholas Stanley-Price is appointed Director-General. The Programme for Museum Development (PMDA, now referred to as CHDA) begins operating in Mombasa, Kenya.
- 2002 – the Internship and Fellows Programme is established. The first Sharing Conservation Decisions course is held.
- 2003 – ICCROM begins holding biennial Fora in Rome, the first was on Living Religious Heritage. The first course on Architectural Records, Inventories, and Information Systems for Conservation (ARIS) begins.
- 2004 – The ATHAR (conservation of heritage sites in the Arab region) and CollAsia 2010 (conservation of heritage collections in Southeast Asia programmes are launched.
- 2005 – The first Reducing Risks to Collections Course takes place in Rome.
- 2006 – Algerian archaeologist and Assistant Director-General for Culture at UNESCO, Mounir Bouchenaki, is appointed Director-General. ICCROM celebrates the 50th Anniversary of the Resolution of the General Conference to create the centre.
- 2007 – The first course on Safeguarding of Sound and Image Collections (SOIMA) takes place in Rio de Janeiro, Brazil. The first course on the Conservation of Built Heritage (CBH) takes place in Rome. It is an evolution of the ARC course.
- 2008 – The LATAM Programme for conservation in Latin America and the Caribbean is launched.
- 2009 – The AFRICA 2009 Programme concludes. ICCROM celebrates 50 years of operations.
- 2010 – The CollAsia 2010 Programme concludes. CollAsia provided capacity building in the Asia Pacific region for the conservation of movable heritage and taught the importance of integrating communities and intangible heritage into the conservation process. The first edition of the First Aid to Cultural Heritage (FAC) course is held in Rome. This multi-partner course is also offered in Haiti in response the 2010 earthquake, and has since been held in multiple editions worldwide.
- 2011 – Stefano De Caro, an Italian archaeologist, is appointed Director-General of ICCROM. The RE-ORG platform is launched in collaboration with UNESCO, providing tools and guidance for storage reorganization to smaller museums.
- 2012 - A new programme for Disaster Risk Management (DRM) is launched.
- 2013 - The ICCROM Forum on Conservation Science is held in October 2013, bringing together conservation professionals from around the world to discuss the relevance of conservation science to the greater global agenda.
- 2014 – The ICCROM-ATHAR Regional Conservation Centre is inaugurated in Sharjah, UAE.
- 2015 – ICCROM includes cultural heritage on agenda of Third World Conference on Disaster Risk Reduction (WCDRR), Sendai, Japan. The FAC course is held in Nepal to support post-emergency heritage recovery after the Nepal earthquake.
- 2016 – ICCROM assists with capacity-building activities at the site of Bagan in the wake of the earthquake in Myanmar.
- 2017 – Webber Ndoro is appointed Director-General of ICCROM.
- 2023 – Aruna Francesca Maria Gujral is appointed Director-General of ICCROM, becoming the first woman to hold the position.

== Organizational structure ==
ICCROM's governance consists of the General Assembly, the Council and the Secretariat.

=== General Assembly ===
The General Assembly is composed of delegates from all ICCROM Member States, who convene in Rome every two years to set the organization's policies, approve the programme of activities and budget, and elect members of the council. The Director-General is appointed by the General Assembly upon nomination by the Council when a new term begins or a vacancy arises. The General Assembly also approves reports on the activities of the Council and the Secretariat, determines Member States’ assessed contributions, and adopts revisions to ICCROM's Statutes, the Rules of Procedure of the General Assembly and the Financial Regulations as necessary.

=== Council ===
The Council of ICCROM is composed of up to 25 members elected by the General Assembly in their personal capacity, based on their recognized competence in the conservation, protection, and restoration of cultural property. Elected Council members do not represent their governments and serve independently in their personal capacity. In making these appointments, the General Assembly takes into account the need for equitable geographical and cultural representation, as well as coverage of a broad range of relevant technical and professional disciplines.

In addition to the elected members, the Council includes three ex officio members with full voting rights: a representative of the Government of Italy (as host country), a representative of UNESCO, and a representative of the Istituto Centrale per il Restauro (ICR).

The council also includes three non-voting members: one representative each from ICOM, ICOMOS, and IUCN.

=== Secretariat ===
The Secretariat of ICCROM consists of the Director-General and staff. The Director-General is responsible for the execution of the approved programme of activities. Staff are distributed between sectors dealing with immovable heritage (monuments, archaeological sites, historic cities, etc.), movable heritage (such as museum collections), Knowledge and Communication (the Library and Archives, publications, the web site), the didactic Laboratory, and Finance and Administration.

== Controversies ==
In 2025, several articles in the Italian Insider an English-language online and print tabloid based in Rome known for publishing commentary on Italian politics and international organisations headquartered in Italy, raised concerns about the leadership and governance of ICCROM under Director-General Aruna Francesca Maria Gujral. One report alleged inconsistencies in Gujral's stated academic qualifications and career history, highlighting alleged discrepancies between her official biography, LinkedIn entries, and other public records.

Other reports criticized the recruitment of retired officials from the Food and Agriculture Organization of the United Nations (FAO) as consultants, many without competitive selection. Critics argued that such hires were costly and sometimes in potential conflict with United Nations Pension Fund rules limiting remuneration of retirees drawing pensions.

Controversy followed Gujral's decision to appoint herself as ad interim Administration Manager in 2024, which was described as a conflict of interest undermining financial oversight structures.

== Member states ==
- Afghanistan – (07.02.2010)
- Albania – (02.04.1962)
- Algeria – (18.01.1973)
- Andorra – (04.06.1998)
- Angola – (04.06.1992)
- Argentina – (29.08.1988)
- Armenia – (05.05.2004)
- Australia – (26.06.1975)
- Austria – (20.05.1957)
- Azerbaijan – (03.01.2002)
- Bahrain – (15.12.2005)
- Bangladesh – (18.10.2007)
- Barbados – (01.04.1985)
- Belgium – (07.07.1959)
- Benin – (05.06.1986)
- Bolivia – (17.12.2004)
- Bosnia and Herzegovina – (19.07.2000)
- Botswana – (02.02.2002)
- Brazil – (21.08.1964)
- Brunei Darussalam – (24.12.2005)
- Bulgaria – (12.01.1960)
- Burkina Faso – (04.01.1988)
- Cambodia – (03.06.1961)
- Cameroon – (03.06.1995)
- Canada – (07.11.1978)
- Chad – (02.02.2000)
- Chile – (03.02.1981)
- China – (14.06.2000)
- Colombia – (18.05.1971)
- Republic of the Congo – (18.04.1999)
- Costa Rica – (11.10.2019)
- Croatia – (18.10.1993)
- Cuba – (25.06.1971)
- Cyprus – (02.05.1963)
- Czech Republic – (30.03.1996)
- Dominican Republic – (20.02.1958)
- Ecuador – (19.11.2003)
- Egypt – (05.11.1959)
- Estonia – (09.02.2001)
- Eswatini – (25.10.2007)
- Ethiopia – (05.12.1975)
- Finland – (03.07.1981)
- France – (25.09.1964)
- Gabon – (20.03.1961)
- Gambia – (10.01.1999)
- Georgia – (23.12.2001)
- Germany – (30.10.1964)
- Ghana – (12.02.1959)
- Greece – (17.03.1987)
- Guatemala – (18.09.1975)
- Guyana – (16.10.1999)
- Haiti – (21.05.1992)
- Honduras – (26.05.1964)
- Hungary – (29.11.2017)
- India – (02.10.1961)
- Iran – (18.12.1972)
- Iraq – (28.10.2011)
- Ireland – (22.12.1986)
- Israel – (23.05.1958)
- Italy – (24.10.1960)
- Ivory Coast – (17.12.1985)
- Japan – (19.12.1967)
- Jordan – (06.07.1958)
- Kenya – (03.05.1998)
- Kuwait – (20.03.1962)
- Lao People's Democratic Republic – (21.06.2006)
- Latvia — (31.03.2012)
- Lebanon – (02.07.1958)
- Lesotho – (01.07.2007)
- Libya – (01.09.1959)
- Lithuania – (21.10.1991)
- Luxembourg – (18.12.1978)
- Madagascar – (03.09.1963)
- Malaysia – (04.11.1966)
- Maldives – (07.07.2012)
- Mali – (19.11.2003)
- Malta – (24.08.1965)
- Mauritania – (29.11.2009)
- Mauritius – (29.07.1998)
- Mexico – (17.07.1961)
- Monaco – (13.12.2007)
- Mongolia – (30.07.2003)
- Montenegro – (16.09.2007)
- Morocco – (24.04.1958)
- Mozambique – (17.12.2003)
- Myanmar – (05.10.1987)
- Namibia – (28.11.1998)
- Nepal – (23.06.1969)
- Netherlands – (14.04.1959)
- New Zealand – (19.03.1987)
- Nicaragua – (30.08.1971)
- Nigeria – (12.12.1961)
- North Macedonia – (12.10.1993)
- Norway – (01.01.1980)
- Oman – (13.12.2003)
- Pakistan – (30.10.1963)
- Paraguay – (21.06.1973)
- Peru – (05.02.1962)
- Philippines – (15.12.1983)
- Poland – (10.05.1958)
- Portugal – (14.09.1967)
- Qatar – (26.04.2012)
- Republic of Korea – (22.07.1968)
- Romania – (19.06.1960)
- Russian Federation – (01.05.2014)
- Rwanda – (17.12.2004)
- San Marino – (27.11.2025)
- Saudi Arabia – (18.02.2000)
- Senegal – (15.01.2006)
- Serbia – (17.06.1959)
- Seychelles – (05.10.2006)
- Slovakia – (24.11.2000)
- Slovenia – (29.03.1996)
- South Africa – (17.01.2004)
- Spain – (19.04.1958)
- Sri Lanka – (04.09.1958)
- Sudan – (10.11.1960)
- Sweden – (01.09.1969)
- Switzerland – (25.03.1959)
- Syrian Arab Republic – (05.11.1959)
- Tajikistan - (17.04.2022)
- Thailand – (08.02.1967)
- Togo – (11.09.2005)
- Trinidad and Tobago – (18.11.2007)
- Tunisia – (21.05.1969)
- Turkey – (07.01.1969)
- Ukraine – (15.01.2016)
- United Arab Emirates – (22.01.2010)
- United Kingdom of Great Britain and Northern Ireland – (04.01.1968)
- United Republic of Tanzania – (21.04.2004)
- Uruguay – (09.03.2002)
- Uzbekistan – (30.08.2024)
- Venezuela – (29.11.1989)
- Vietnam – (07.08.1972)
- Yemen – (18.06.2008)
- Zambia – (12.09.2003)
- Zimbabwe – (19.11.1993)

=== Former member states ===
- United States of America – (20.01.1971 - 07.01.2026)

== Directors-General ==
- Harold J. Plenderleith (1959–1971)
- Paul Philippot (1971–1977)
- Sir Bernard M. Feilden (1977–1981)
- Cevat Erder (1981–1988)
- Andrzej Tomaszewski (1988–1992)
- Marc Laenen (1992–2000)
- Nicholas Stanley-Price (2000–2005)
- Mounir Bouchenaki (2006–2011)
- Stefano De Caro (2012–2017)
- Webber Ndoro (2018–2023)
- Aruna Francesca Maria Gujral (2024–present)

== The ICCROM Award ==
Since 1979, the ICCROM Award has been granted to individuals who have given a significant contribution to the development of the institution, and who have special merit in the field of conservation, protection and restoration of cultural heritage. This award is given each biennium to one or two nominees who have been chosen by the council. Below is the list of previous ICCROM Award recipients (in alphabetical order).

- Om Prakash Agrawal – (1993)
- Khaled al-Asaad (Honorary Mention) – (2019)
- Italo C. Angle – (1984)
- Gräfin Agnes Ballestrem – (1995)
- Mounir Bouchenaki – (2000)
- Cesare Brandi – (1979)
- Agnes Brokerhof – (2023)
- Giovanni Carbonara – (2017)
- Maurice Chehab – (1979)
- Paul B. Coremans – (1979)
- Hiroshi Daifuku – (1979)
- Abdel-Aziz Daoulatli – (2005)
- Guglielmo De Angelis d’Ossat – (1979)
- Vasile Dragut – (1990)
- Cevat Erder – (1997)
- Sir Bernard Feilden – (1995)
- Hans Foramitti – (1983)
- Albert France-Lanord – (1988)
- Piero Gazzola – (1979)
- Gaël de Guichen – (2001)
- Frédéric Gysin – (1979)
- Charles Gruchy – (1997)
- Tomokichi Iwasaki – (1986)
- Jukka Jokilehto – (2000)
- Marisa Laurenzi Tabasso – (2009)
- Raymond M. Lemaire – (1981)
- Johan Lodewijks – (1992)
- Zhou Lu – (2013)
- Stanislas Lorentz – (1979)
- Nils Marstein – (2009)
- Giovanni Massari – (1981)
- Katsuhiko Masuda – (2007)
- Laura Mora – (1984)
- Paolo Mora – (1984)
- Bruno Mühlethaler – (1988)
- Webber Ndoro - (2015)
- Colin Pearson – (2003)
- Paul Perrot – (1990)
- Paul Philippot – (1981)
- Harold J. Plenderleith – (1979)
- Gianfranco Pompei – (1979)
- Sir Norman Reid – (1983)
- Grellan Rourke – (2019)
- Herb Stovel – (2011)
- Jean Taralon – (1984)
- Johannes Taubert – (1984)
- Garry Thomson – (1986)
- Agnes Timar-Balazsy – (2001)
- Giorgio Torraca – (1990)
- Gertrude Tripp – (1981)
- Giovanni Urbani – (1993)
- Arthur Van Schendel – (1979)
- Gamini Wijesuriya – (2021)
