= Hotel Laurus al Duomo =

Hotel in Florence, Italy

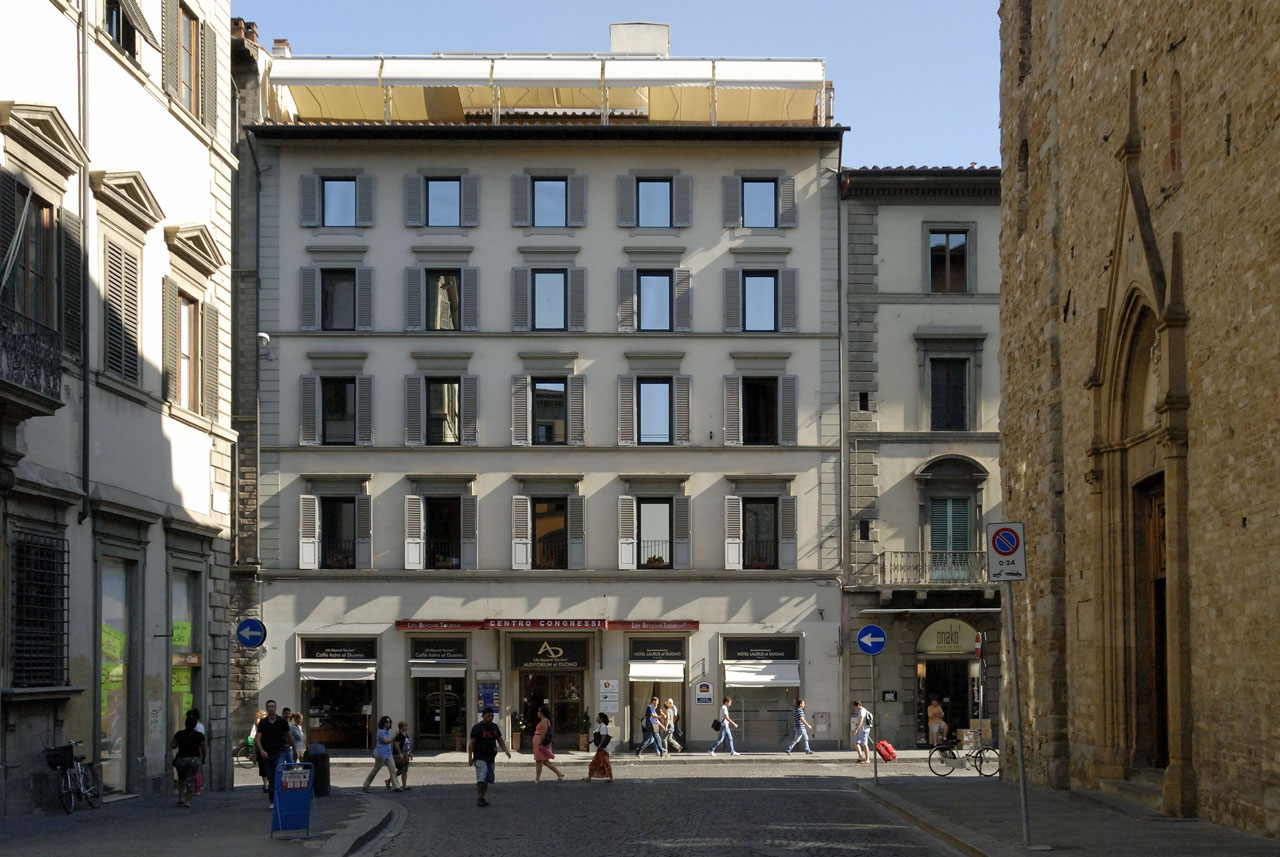
- Hotel Laurus al Duomo
- Interactive map of the Hotel Laurus al Duomo area

General information
- Location: Italy, Via de’ Cerretani 54/r, Florence, Italy
- Coordinates: 43.773496°N 11.2527657°E

Website
- www.florencehotellaurusalduomo.com/en/hotel/

The Hotel Laurus al Duomo is a hotel in Florence, in the historical Via de' Cerretani, with a façade in Via dell'Alloro. The building is about 70 meters away from Piazza del Duomo, Florence, the Florence Cathedral and the Giotto's Campanile. The building is not far from the Basilica of Santa Maria Novella and from the Firenze Santa Maria Novella railway station. The building is also in front of the church of Santa Maria Maggiore, Florence. The building of the hotel is also the location of Auditorium al Duomo and of Caffè Astra al Duomo. The hotel, together with Hotel Pitti Palace al Ponte Vecchio, Auditorium al Duomo and Caffè Astra al Duomo is part of the system Centro Congressi al Duomo and shares the ethos Life Beyond Tourism.

== History ==
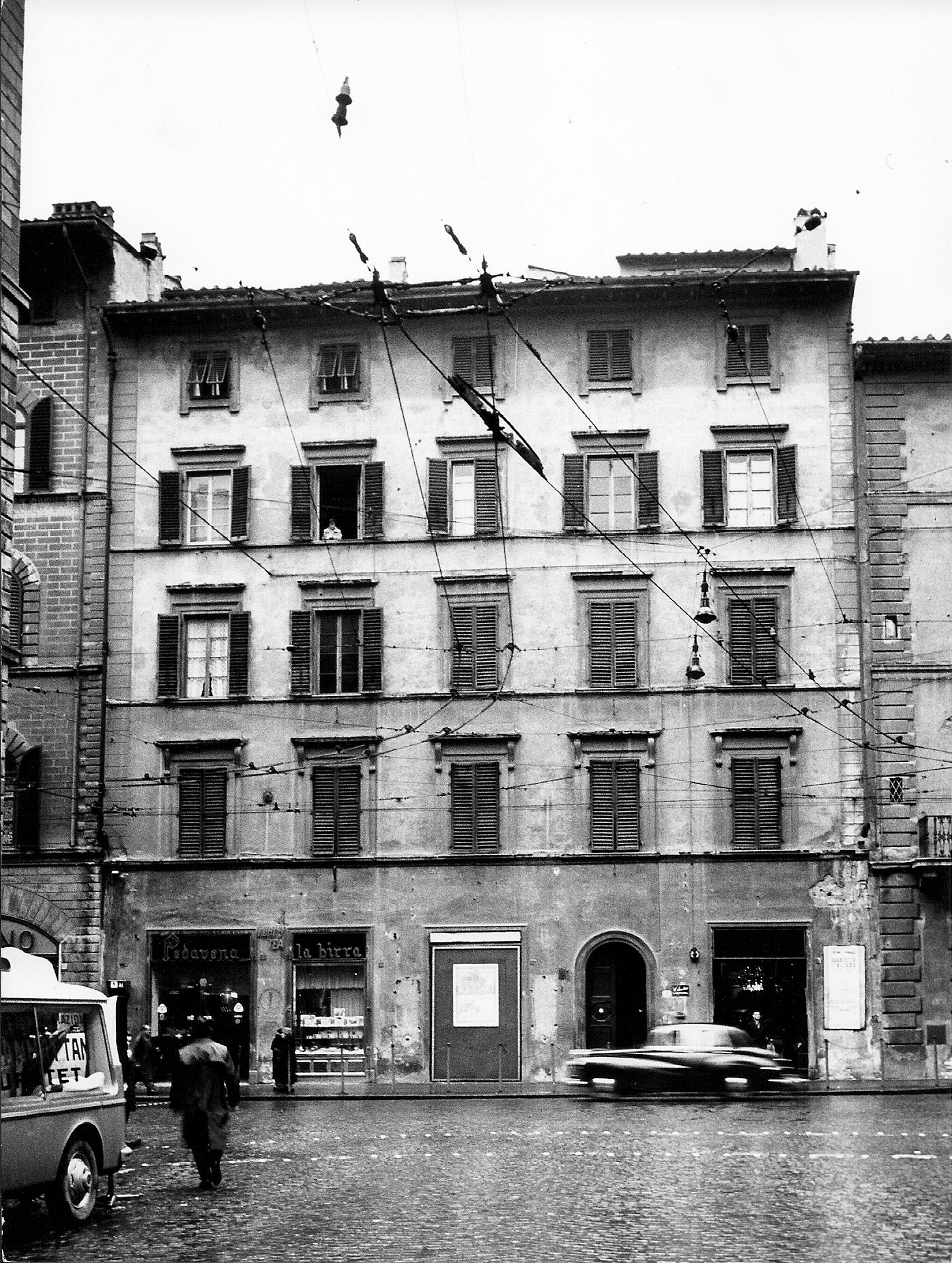
Hotel Laurus before restoration

Part of the building of the Hotel Laurus al Duomo was the ancient location of the Oratory of the “Societas Beati Bartolomei”, whose protector was Saint Bartholomew. In Via de’ Cerretani, till the mid 19th century, stood the palaces of the Carnesecchi and the Cappelli houses. When Florence became Italy’s capital city (1864-1870), the area was reorganized one first time. A new reorganization took place in the 1930s and Via de’ Cerretani was widened. Many medieval buildings were pulled down and replaced by modern palaces.

In the 1970s, an important restoration of the building begun but the historic 1800 façade was maintained. During the 1966 flood of the Arno, the hotel was under construction. Only the basements, the stairs and the third floor garret had been built. Probably these structures prevented the tumbling down of the nearby edifices. In 1972, part of the building was turned into a first class 4 star hotel with the name of “Laurus”, to keep some memory of the ancient history of the area and in particular of the laurel grove placed between Via dell’Alloro and Via del Giglio. In 1989, the Hotel Laurus al Duomo was acquired by the hotel company Vivahotels. In 2004, the hotel was restored once again to the shape it has today.

== Interior ==
The hotel offers 50 rooms of different categories, equipped and styled with typical 1800s Florentine furniture. From the terrace at the top floor, it is possible to get an unusual panoramic view of Brunelleschi's Dome.

== See also ==
- Paolo Del Bianco
- Historic Centre of Florence

== Bibliography ==
- Piero Bargellini, Ennio Guarnieri, “Le strade di Firenze”, Florence, Bonechi, 1980.
- Anna Benvenuti, “Il sovramondo delle arti fiorentine. Tra i santi delle corporazioni”, in “Arti fiorentine. La grande storia dell’artigianato, vol I, Il Medioevo, Florence, 1998, p. 16.
