= Life Beyond Tourism =

Web portal for sustainable tourism

- Abbreviation: LBT
- Established: 2008
- Legal status: Active
- Website: www.lifebeyondtourism.org

Life Beyond Tourism (in short LBT) is a nonprofit worldwide portal free of banners, based in Florence, Italy. The portal dates back to 2008 and stems from an orientation by the Romualdo Del Bianco Foundation. The portal is an international platform for exchange of experiences and good practices in the framework of a tourism based on values and not only on services and consumerism.

== History ==
The portal originates from an orientation of the Romualdo Del Bianco Foundation. In 20 years of activity, the Foundation elaborated a new concept of the cultural heritage as an instrument of understanding among cultures. According to this orientation, cultural heritage is not only to be safeguarded and enhanced, but also to be “used and enjoyed” to foster intercultural dialogue.

In September 2008 the Romualdo Del Bianco Foundation announced the establishment of the association Life Beyond Tourism for Intercultural Dialogue. Soon after, a Declaration of Intents was signed (March 2008) by 59 experts of the Foundation from 20 countries.

In February 2011 the association developed the Life Beyond Tourism Non-Profit Portal. According to the LBT Manifesto “the tourist is a potential harbinger of knowledge and of intercultural dialogue” and therefore “the tourist destination is a workshop of knowledge, providing all visitors with an opportunity for cultural growth” The Province of Florence welcomed the LBT orientation and decided to promote it. Many other cultural institutions and public administrations in Central Europe and Eurasia also joined the initiative.

=== Main features ===
Life Beyond Tourism gathers the cultural expressions representing a given region to provide a good picture of its “cultural personality” resulting from the interaction between its cultural heritage and ongoing developments. The aim of the portal is to convey a territory’s specific features and to emphasize the way in which tangible and intangible heritage is combined to human and environmental levels. The portal is addressed to all cultural institutions, companies, professional and individuals who share the philosophy of the portal. In particular there are some typologies of members:

- cultural institutions, academies, foundations, associations, local authorities that operates in the field of cultural heritage;
- enterprises and companies rooted in the territory
- individuals that share the values of the LBT Manifesto and are willing to understand the cultural personality of a given territory

The portal is non-profit: the profits of memberships are reinvested into for cultural and development initiatives in the territory itself. The supporters of Life Beyond Tourism promote a tourism of high cultural quality with a special focus on intercultural dialogue.

=== Patronage and members ===
Many organizations granted their patronage to Life Beyond Tourism. Among them: ICCROM, ICOMOS Italia, the Council of Europe, the Società Italiana per la Protezione dei Beni Culturali (CIPBC), the Borsa Mediterranea del Turismo Archeologico, the Associazione Città e Siti Italiani Patrimonio Mondiale UNESCO. Among the Italian local authorities: The Region of Tuscany, the Province of Florence, the Municipality of Florence, many municipalities in Tuscany (Castelfiorentino, Forte dei Marmi, Montecatini, Reggello, San Piero a Sieve, Scarperia. For the moment also the Kraków and the Tbilisi municipalities granted their patronage.

The members that joined LBT are from many countries: Albania, Armenia, Argentina, Australia, Austria, Azerbaijan, Belarus, Belgium, Bosnia & Herzegovina, Bulgaria, Canada, China, Vatican City, Colombia, Croatia, the Czech Republic, Denmark, Estonia, Finland, France, Georgia, Germany, the United Kingdom, Greece, Hungary, Ireland, Israel, Japan, Jordan, Kazakhstan, Kosovo, Kyrgyzstan, Latvia, Lithuania, Moldova, Macedonia, Mexico, Morocco, Poland, Romania, Russia, Serbia, Slovakia, Spain, Syria, Sweden, Taiwan, Turkmenistan, Ukraine, United Arab Emirates, the U.S., Uzbekistan.

=== Readings ===
- Life Beyond Tourism® (2014) Travel and Dialogue - The Model, its Manual, its Certification, Florence
- Del Bianco P. (2014) From Florence “Travel for Dialogue” – Life Beyond Tourism® - For Sustainable Development, The Model, its Manual, its Certification, Florence
- Laenen M. (2014) Cultural Biography, Florence
- Life Beyond Tourism® (2014) Travel and Dialogue - The Model, its Manual, its Certification, Florence
- Board of Directors (2014) The Life Beyond Tourism – travel for dialogue model, Florence
- Life Beyond Tourism® (2014) Travel and Dialogue - The Model, its Manual, its Certification, Florence
- Del Bianco C. De Simone G. (2014) Certification: activity for the certification of travel for dialogue in accordance with the Life Beyond Tourism Philosophy, Version Ed.0 February 2014, Florence
- Life Beyond Tourism® (2014) Travel and Dialogue - The Model, its Manual, its Certification, Florence
- Liberatore G. (2014) Manual for the practical application of the model, Florence
- Del Bianco C. Bossi M. (2014) The Life Beyond Tourism Heritage Community Portal, Florence
- Life Beyond Tourism® (2014) Travel and Dialogue, Florence
- Del Bianco P. (2014) Life Beyond Tourism: young people “Travelling for dialogue with heritage” in order to grasp cultural diversity, a wish for the ICOMOS General Assembly 2014, Florence
- Laenen M. (2014) From heritage conservation to its social fruition for society and humanity: the interpretation and presentation of the cultural biography of living environments/cultural landscapes: travel for intercultural dialogue, Florence
- Life Beyond Tourism® (2014) Travel and Dialogue, Florence
- Heritage for Intercultural Dialogue in a sustainable Development – The Fondazione’s Manifesto for 2014 and the LBT movement
- The Life Beyond Tourism Model implemented in the field
- Del Bianco C. (2014) How to start a “Beyond Tourism” activity, Florence

== See also ==
- World Heritage Sites
- Heritage interpretation
- Cultural geography
- Types of tourism
- Cultural tourism
- Archaeological tourism
- Alternative tourism
- Heritage tourism
- Hospitality industry
- Andrzej Tomaszewski
- Paolo Del Bianco
