= Life Beyond (disambiguation) =

Life Beyond may refer to:

- Life Beyond, a web series by John Boswell
- Life Beyond the Box: Norman Stanley Fletcher, a comedy docudrama airing on BBC Television
- Life Beyond the Box: Margo Leadbetter, another comedy docudrama airing on BBC Television
- Life Beyond L.A., an album by Ambrosia
- Life Beyond Tourism, a nonprofit portal based in Italy
- Extraterrestrial life, often named "life beyond Earth."
