= Cultural tourism =

Geographical tourism around a country or a region

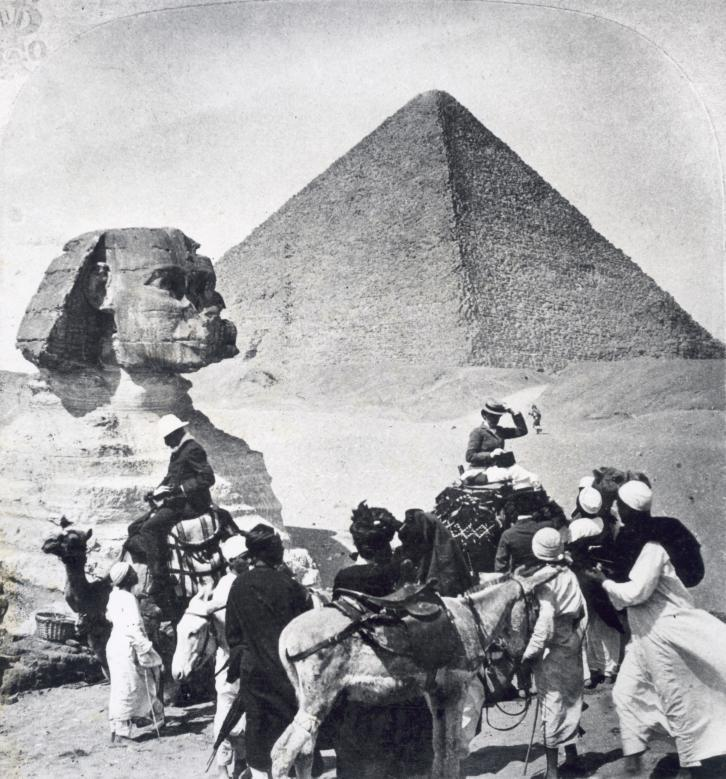
Cultural tourism in Egypt in the 19th century.

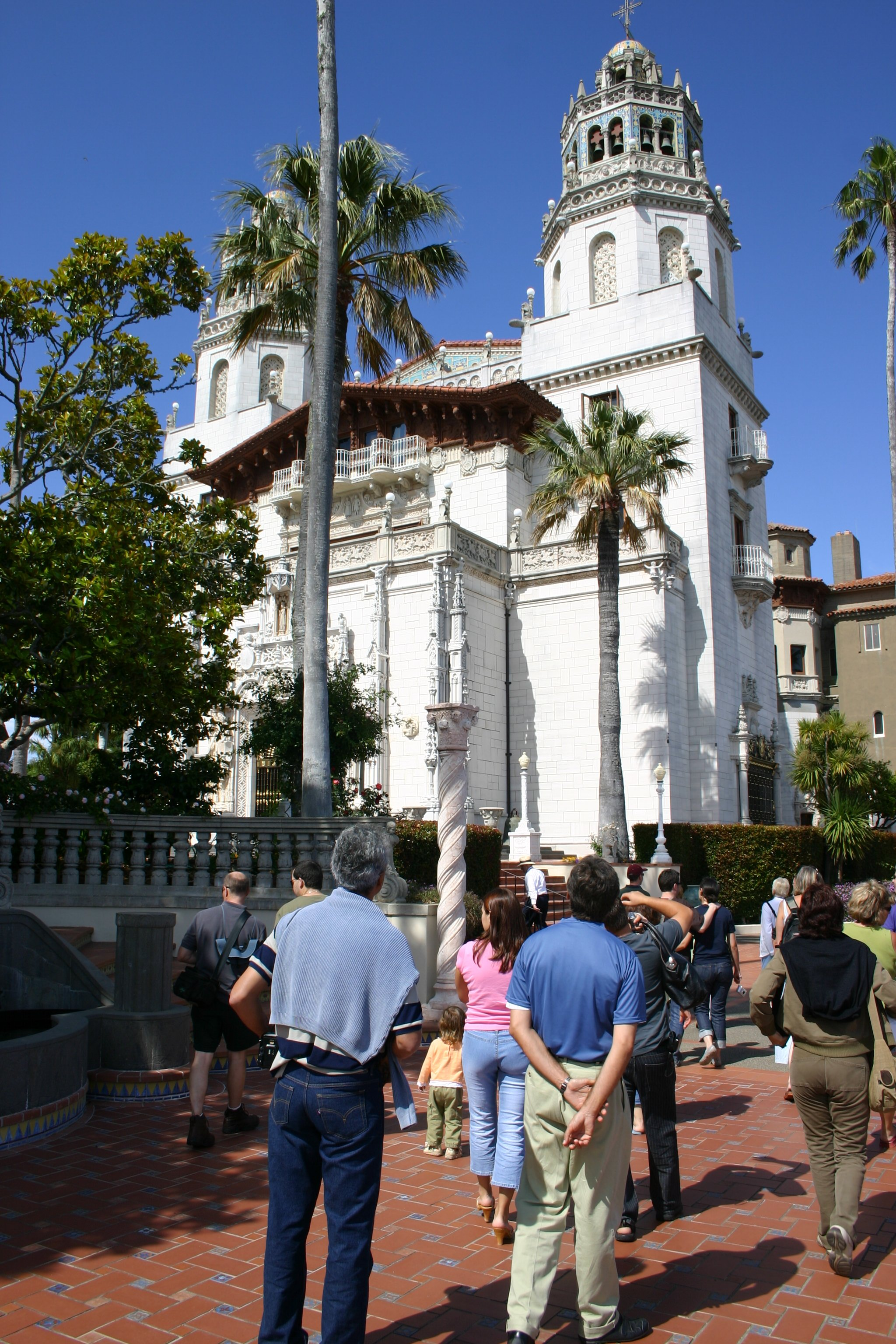
Tourists at Hearst Castle, California.

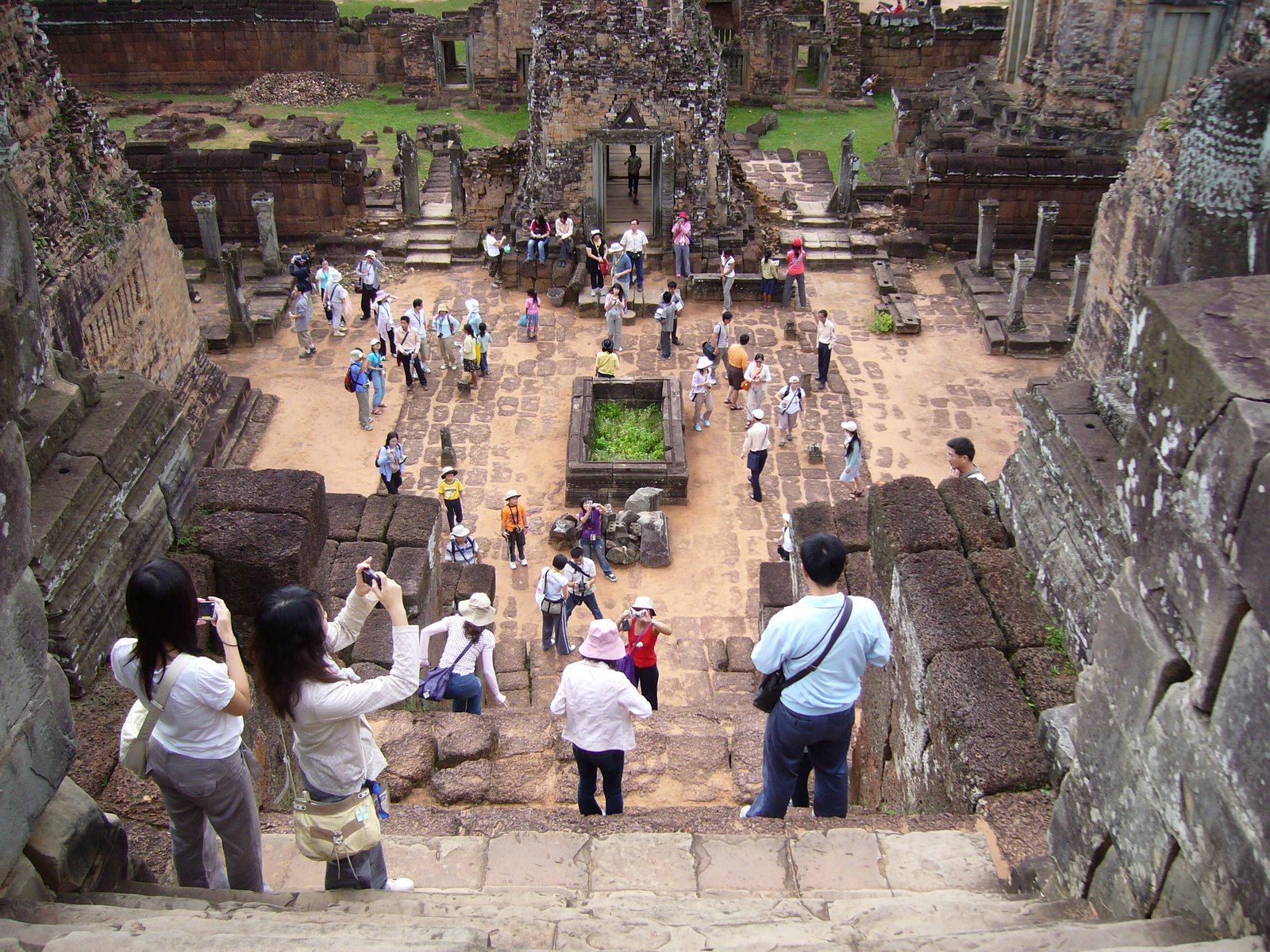
Tourists taking pictures at the khmer Pre Rup temple ruins, an example of cultural tourism.

Cultural tourism is a type of tourism in which the visitor's essential motivation is to learn, discover, experience and consume the cultural attractions and products offered by a tourist destination. These attractions and products relate to the intellectual, spiritual, and emotional features of a society that encompasses arts and architecture, historical and cultural heritage, culinary heritage, literature, music, creative industries as well as the living cultures with their lifestyles, value systems, beliefs and traditions.

== Overview ==
Cultural tourism experiences include, but are not limited to, architectural and archaeological treasures, culinary activities, festivals or events, historic or heritage, sites, monuments and landmarks, museums and exhibitions, national parks and wildlife sanctuaries, and religious venues. It includes tourism in urban areas, particularly historic or large cities and their cultural facilities such as theatres, as well as tourism in remote, indigenous regions. In the twenty-first-century United States, national parks and a limited number of Native American councils continue to promote "tribal tourism." The U.S. National Park Service has publicly endorsed this strain of cultural tourism, despite lingering concerns over exploitation and the potential hazards of ecotourism in Native America.

Proponents of cultural tourism say that it gives the local population the opportunity to benefit financially from their cultural heritage and thus to appreciate and preserve it, while giving visitors the opportunity to broaden their personal horizons. Cultural tourism also has negative sides. There may be negative effects on local residents, such as making the local economy unstable, increasing the cost of living for local residents, increasing pollution, or creating environmental problems. Also, the local population is at risk of coming into contact with new ways of life that can disrupt their social fabric.

This form of tourism is becoming generally more popular throughout the world, and a recent OECD report has highlighted the role that cultural tourism can play in regional development in different world regions. Cultural tourism has recently shifted towards meeting the growing desire for cultural "experiences" in particular.

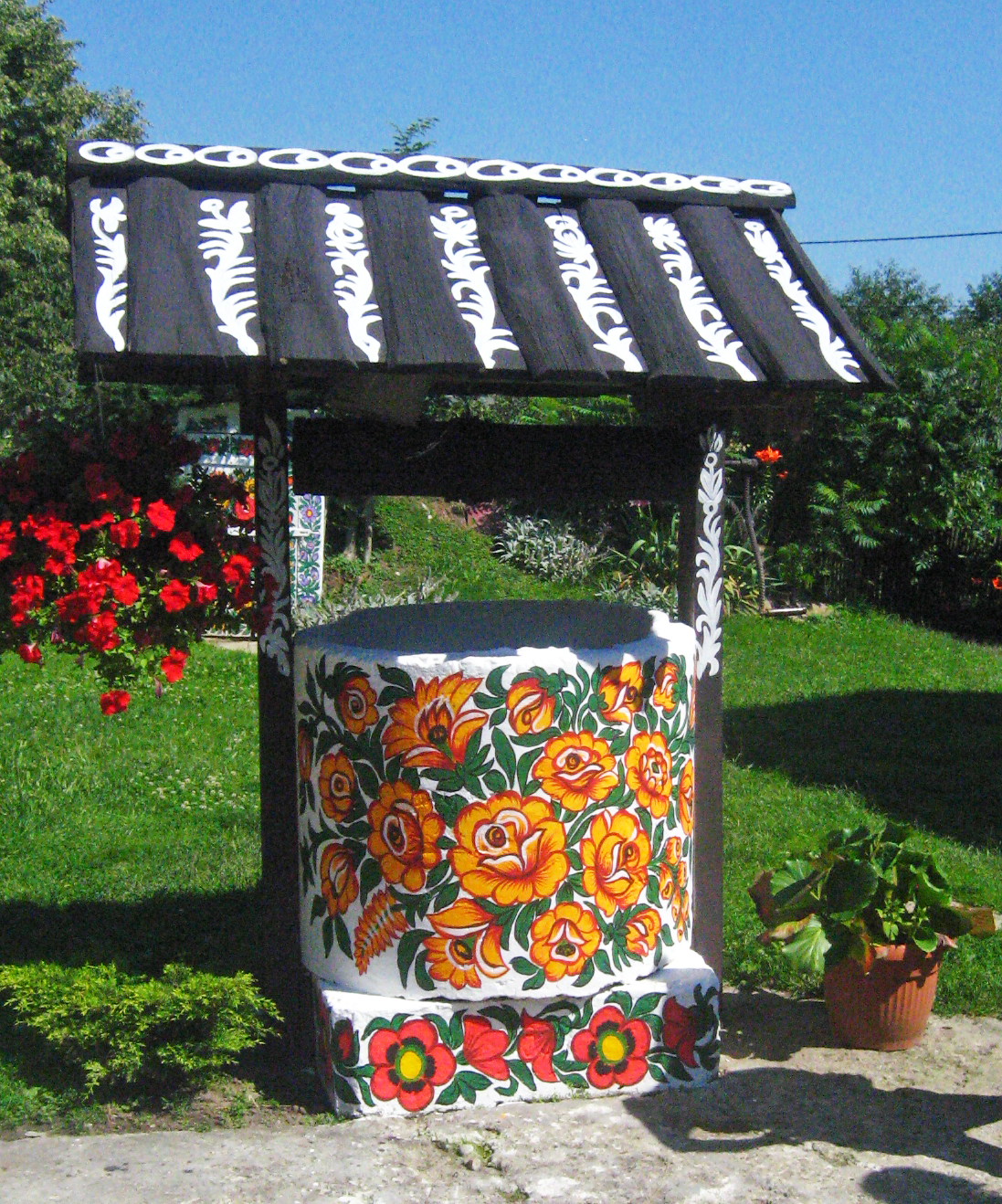
A decorated water well in Zalipie, Poland

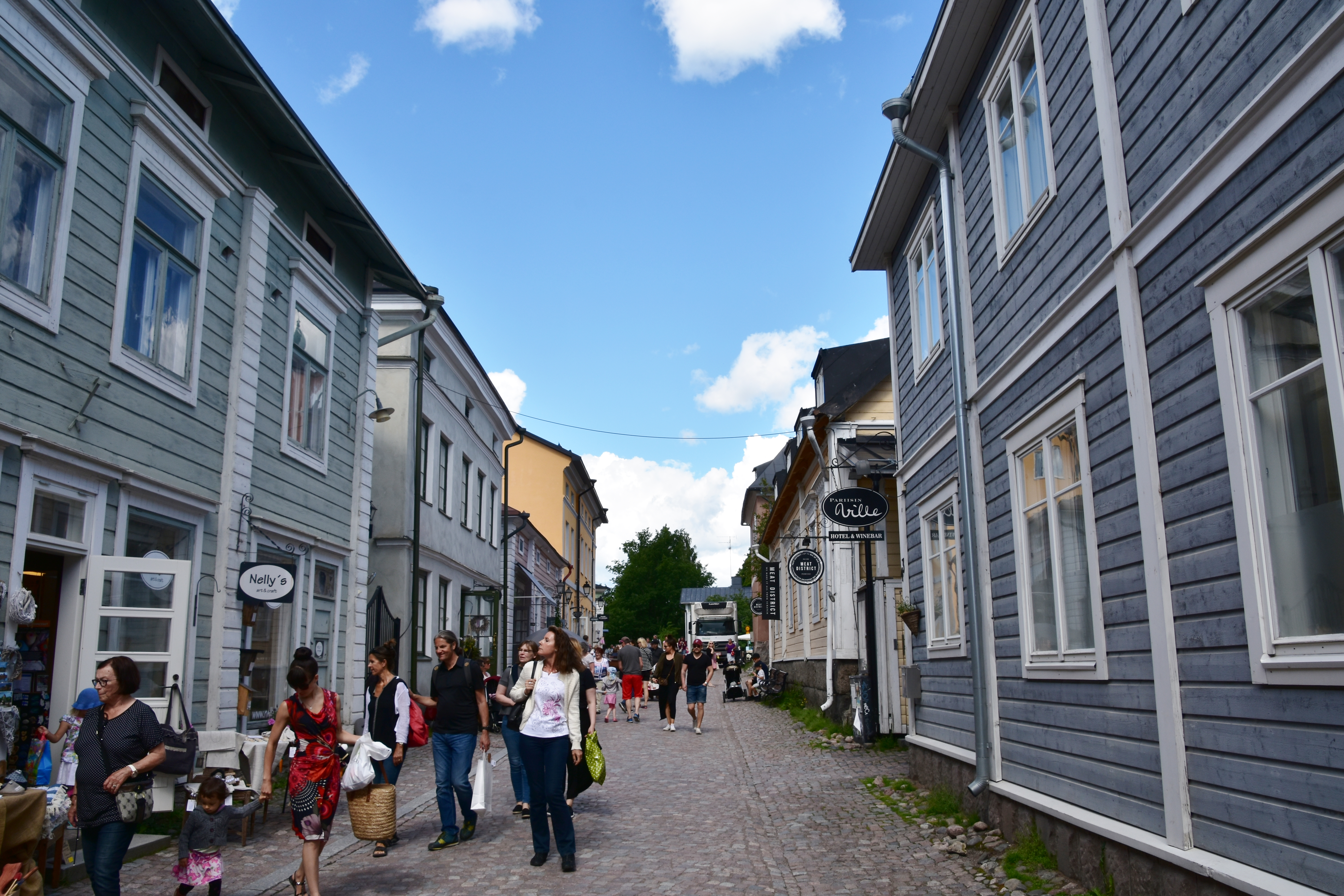
Tourists at the cultural historical Old Town of Porvoo

Sectors of cultural tourism can be distinguished both by the destination (urban cultural tourism, rural cultural tourism, etc.) as well as the theme of the trip (heritage tourism, popular culture tourism, etc.). The main subcategories are discussed in more detail below.

== Subcategories of Cultural Tourism ==
=== Heritage tourism ===
- Archaeological sites
- Monuments
- Architecture
- Museums
- Religious sites

Heritage tourism involves traveling to a site of cultural significance to engage with the heritage of the region and local population. In recent years, more attention has been put on the inclusion and thoughtful representation of the history of marginalized groups for the tourist audience, marked by UNESCO's updates to their World Heritage List, which is a comprehensive list of significant heritage sites.

=== Arts tourism ===
- Theater
- Concerts and music venues
- Galleries
- Festivals, carnivals and events
- Literary sites

Arts tourism involves traveling to the location of an art exhibit, which includes live-performances, museums, and libraries. Arts tourism is a relatively less common form of cultural tourism, due both the historical exclusivity of the arts scene, and the option for artists to go on tour, eliminating the need for tourism. Even so, in recent years, the arts community has put increased emphasis on prioritizing the accessibility of local art and exhibits.

=== Creative tourism ===
- Photography
- Painting
- Pottery
- Culinary arts
- Language learning

Creative Tourism involves active participation from tourists in cultural experiences specific to each holiday destination. This form of tourism is more recently theorized and defined by Greg Richards and Crispin Raymond in 2000. They defined creative tourism as: "Tourism which offers visitors the opportunity to develop their creative potential through active participation in courses and learning experiences, which are characteristic of the holiday destination where they are taken." (Richards, Greg et Raymond, Crispin, 2000).

This type of tourism is opposed to mass tourism and allows the destinations to diversify and offer innovative activities different from other destinations.

Similarly, UNESCO launched in 2004 a program entitled Creative Cities Network. This network aims to highlight cities around the world that are putting creativity at the heart of their sustainable urban development plan. Creative cities are organized into seven categories representing seven different creative fields: crafts and folk arts, digital arts, film, design, gastronomy, literature, and music. As of January 2020, the network has 246 members across all categories. In order to promote the development of this new type of tourism, a non-profit organization was created in Barcelona in 2010: Creative Tourism Network. Its missions involve, among others: the promotion of creative tourism, the creation of a network of "Creativefriendly" cities but also awards celebration, The Creative Tourism Awards."

=== Urban cultural tourism ===
- Historic cities
- Regenerated industrial cities
- Waterfront development
- Arts and heritage attractions
- Shopping
- Nightlife

Urban cultural tourism involves traveling to urban sites of cultural significance, which often offer a range of both historical and recreational attractions. Certain major urban cities with cultural offerings are listed in UNESCO's world heritage site and have been lauded for their promotion of cross-cultural exchange. Other urban cultural tourist sites are post-industrial cities, who offer tourists a slice of their history alongside modern recreation, such as shopping and nightlife.

=== Rural cultural tourism ===
- Village, farm or agro-tourism
- Eco-museums
- National parks
- Wine trails

Rural cultural tourism involves traveling to rural sites of cultural significance. Similarly to urban cultural tourist sites, many rural sites are cities whose main industries have declined, that supplement their economies by offering various attractions, such as wine-tasting. Other rural cultural sites have great historical significance, such as national parks.

=== Indigenous cultural tourism ===
- Hilltribe, desert or mountain trekking
- Visits to cultural centers
- Arts and crafts (by local artists)
- Cultural performances
- Festivals

Indigenous cultural tourism is defined as "any service or product that is a) owned and operated at least in part by an Indigenous group and b) results from a means of exchange with outside guests." Most indigenous community have faced historic marginalization, which has led many proponents of cultural tourism to emphasize the need for sensitivity around these cultural events, as well as the importance of the indigenous population's control over how their culture is represented. Experts recognize that "the capitalization of Native identity has been a feature of Native and European interaction since the early colonial period." However, although this legacy is perhaps echoed by modern day indigenous tourism, involvement in the tourism industry allows indigenous populations "[to take] part in the global economy on their own terms."

=== Popular cultural tourism ===
- Theme parks and themed attractions
- Shopping malls
- Pop concerts
- Sporting events
- Media and film sets
- Industrial heritage sites
- Fashion and design museums

Popular cultural tourism involves any kind of tourist attractions that are modern and mainstream, such as amusement parks or sporting events. Popular cultural tourism has only recently been included under the umbrella of cultural tourism, as recreational activities have gained increasing recognition for their cultural significance.

== Environmental impacts of cultural tourism ==
=== Negative ===
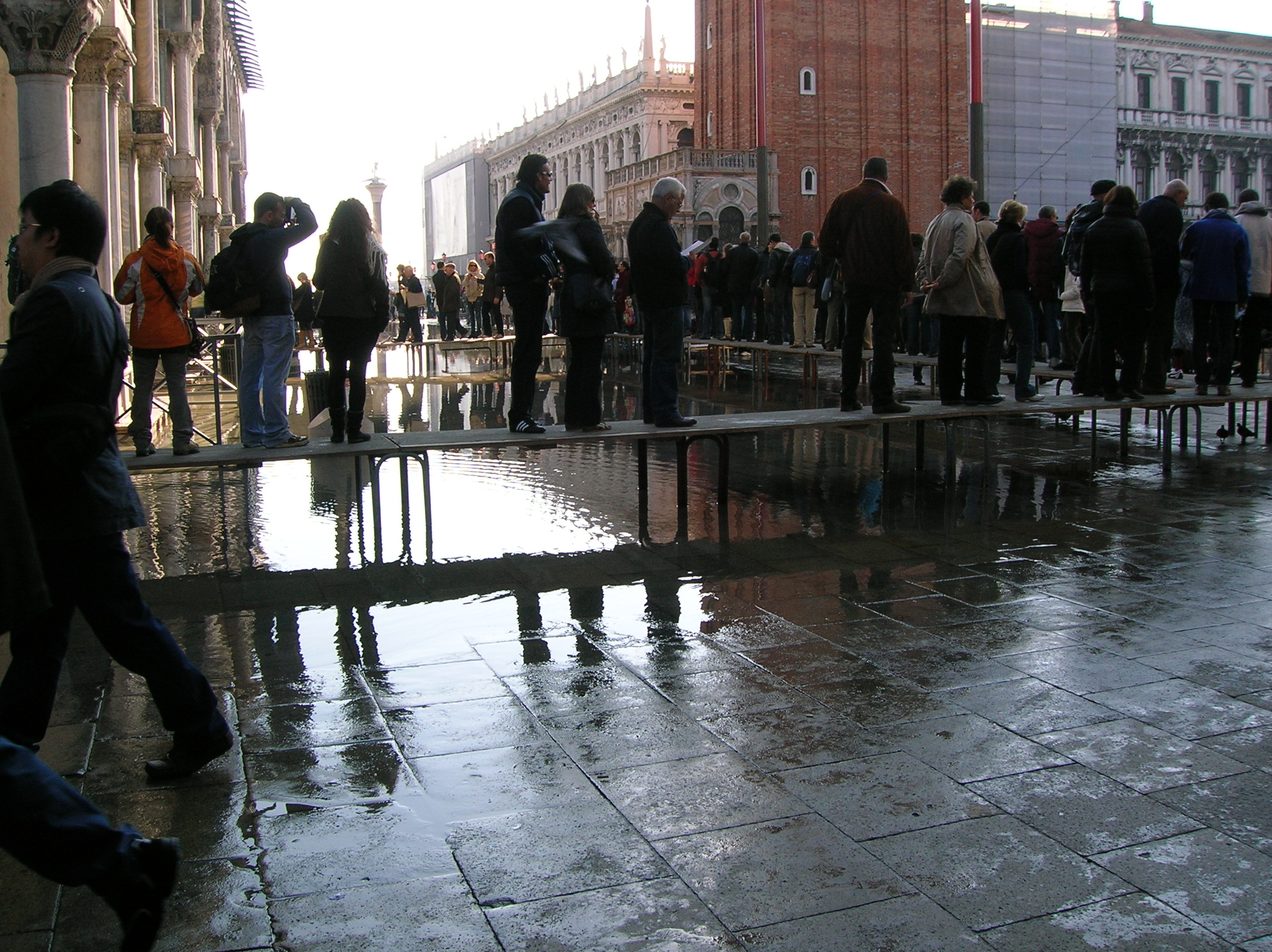
As Climates change and water levels rise, tourism will have to continue to adapt. Seen here with raised platforms to help tourist and locals get around a flooded Venice, Italy.

Increased tourist traffic often leads to greater rates of litter and pollution in a given community. This runs a risk for important cultural landscapes to be exposed to significant damage from human-caused wear and tear--"Tourists are in a peculiar position, because they do not live with the consequences of the pollution they help create or the shortages they help cause." In many ancient European cities, such as Rome, Paris, and Florence, the buildup of air pollutants generated by car exhaust and gas-powered motors has caused the white stone to be covered in pollutants and turned to a gray or black color. These toxic exhausts can also accelerate the corrosion of culturally important stone monuments, statues and heritage buildings.

Changing environmental conditions can have large impacts on human environments and heritage sites, as well. Cultural landscapes can be lost to rising waters and increasingly severe storms. This deterioration, and in the worst case, destruction, can be a major issue in coastal communities and low-lying islands. Floods and rising water levels can also be a direct threat to archaeological sites, historic buildings that hold cultural values, and heritage gardens.

=== Positive ===
Tourism can bring communities economic growth from both job creation and tax revenue from ticket sales to festivals, museums, ancient ruins, religious sites and historic hotels. This increase in economic growth is welcomed by heads of conservation sites, as it often a major source of revenue for important cultural sites where government assistance is lacking. "Tourism can act as an impetus for creating public awareness of the need to preserve the built environment. The establishment of national parks, national monuments and other protected areas is often justified by the existence of tourism"

Cultural tourism stimulates economic growth, preserves heritage, and fosters cross-cultural understanding. It promotes sustainable development and community revitalization, contributing to both local economies and global cultural enrichment through the preservation and celebration of diverse traditions.

== See also ==
- Archaeological tourism
- Cultural diplomacy
- Cultural tourism in Egypt
- Film tourism
- Impacts of tourism
- Literary tourism
- Overtourism
- Sex tourism
- Tourist trap
