= Cultural tourism in Egypt =

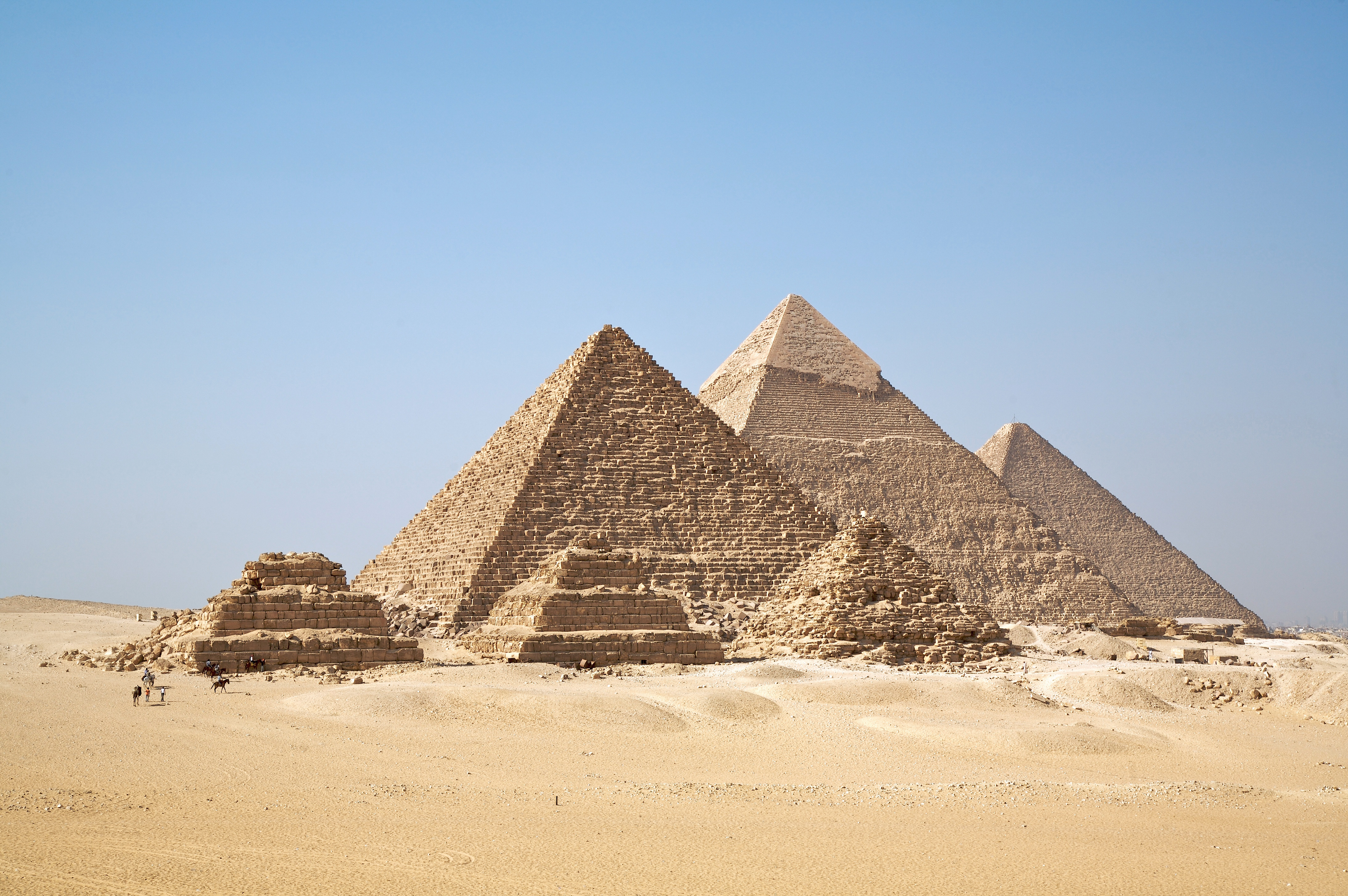
Parklands in Giza with two of the Giza Necropolis pyramids in the background.

Egypt has a thriving cultural tourism industry, built on the country's complex history, multicultural population and importance as a regional centre.

== History ==
Egypt's cultural tourism trade has fluctuated since the 19th century, increasing in popularity alongside the rise of Egyptology as an academic and amateur pursuit. Successive Egyptian governments have placed great emphasis on the value of cultural tourism, "confident that no other countries could actually compete in this area".

== Markets and value ==
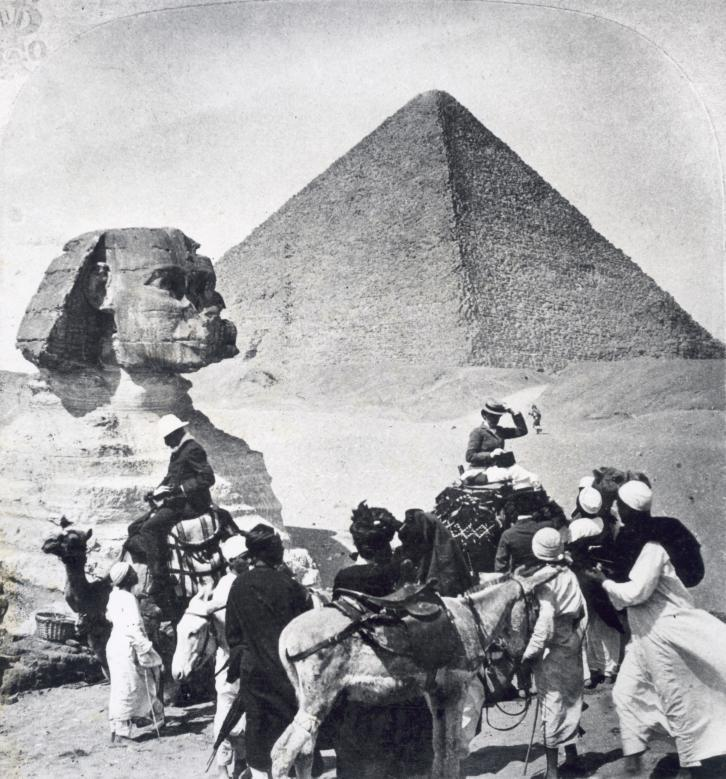
Early 20th century cultural tourists in Egypt.

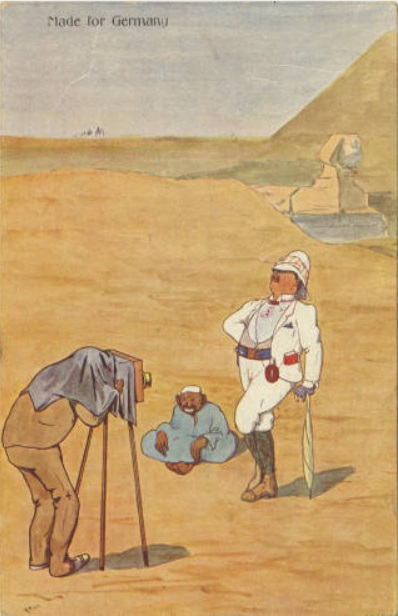
"Made for Germany" satirical postcard

Tourists from South Asia and East Asia, in particular, have been identified as responding well to marketing campaigns that focus on Egyptian cultural tourism. Tourism Bureau representatives have announced plans to increase marketing spending on those regions.

Signature Travel Network writer and Huffington Post columnist Jean Newman Glock notes that Egypt's cultural tourism trade is worth $10 to every $1 spent by tourists whose travel focuses on Egypt's Red Sea resorts. As a result, she says, "Egypt is hoping those interested in exploring their antiquities will return, in great numbers, soon."

According to the Huffington Post's Deborah Lehr;

Before the Arab Spring, tourism accounted for approximately 11 percent of the country's GDP and was a significant job creator in the economy. In the aftermath of the 2011 Revolution, tourism dropped dramatically to 6.7 percent of GDP. Foreign travelers have stayed away during the political turmoil of the past three years. The breakdown in the security infrastructure also led to a massive increase in looting at archaeological sites -- a devastating loss of irreplaceable cultural material. In the months since General el-Sisi has taken power, Egypt has been slowly rebuilding its reputation as a safe destination for the world's adventurers.

== Initiatives ==
According to industry representatives, the government, "recently [2014] announced a master plan to attract 25 million tourists by 2020". The plan includes dedicated online and traditional marketing strategies focused on assuring prospective tourists that cultural tourism centres are safe following the Arab Spring and Egyptian Revolution of 2011.

In 2015, a conglomeration which includes the Egyptian Government signed an agreement with French company Prism to create a sound and light show encompassing the Giza Necropolis pyramids and the nearby Great Sphinx of Giza. The pyramids served as the site of the first African son et lumière in 1961.

== See also ==
- Tourism in Egypt
- Ministry of Tourism (Egypt)
