= Romualdo Del Bianco Foundation =

Italian nonprofit organization

- Founded: 1998
- Founder: Paolo Del Bianco
- Purpose: Cultural heritage, Intercultural dialogue
- Location: Florence, Italy
- Region served: Italy, Eastern Europe, Eurasia
- Method: cultural events, restoration
- Key people: Paolo Del Bianco, President; Simone Giometti, Secretary General
- Website: Official website

The Romualdo Del Bianco Foundation is an Italian non-profit organization established in Florence, Italy, on November 3, 1998, by Paolo Del Bianco - who entitled the Foundation to his father Romualdo. The Foundation is funded privately by Paolo Del Bianco. The Foundation promotes tourism awareness and dialogue between cultures. At the moment, the Foundation network counts over 450 academic institutions and universities in 60 countries in 5 continents.

== History ==
The Foundation originates from the VivaFirenze project, launched in 1994 by the hotel company Vivahotels. The project was intended to make the guests of the hotel company's more sensitive to the cultural heritage of the city of Florence, Italy. The project was also intended to promote contacts between young people of different cultures, in particular from the countries of Central and Eastern Europe and Eurasia, through training and educational projects. The success of these initiatives and the first network of international contacts led Paolo Del Bianco to establish, in 1998, the Romualdo Del Bianco Foundation.

== Mission and activity ==
The Foundation's priority is to promote intercultural dialogue and attentiveness to the importance of cultural heritage. According to statute, the Foundation aims to promote, disseminate and preserve the cultural, artistic, historical and scientific cultural heritage. Moreover, the Foundation aim is to encourage exchanges among young exponents of culture, arts and sciences as well promoting mutual knowledge, understanding, friendship and peace between countries and peoples of different nationalities, religion and ethnicity . The Foundation organizes exhibitions, concerts, competitions, promotes mobility and meetings between young people from different cultures, is funding restoration of cultural heritage. Each year about 700 people – students and teachers - participate into the cultural activities and training of the Foundation. The network has expanded to 59 countries and counts over 300 universities, among which 87 faculties of architecture, 84 faculties of arts and humanities, 70 faculties of engineering, 35 faculties of economics. The network structure is based on committees of national experts who follow and promote the activities of the foundation. The Foundation has signed 158 cooperation agreements with universities and local governments. In brief, the Foundation's activities till today consisted in:

- 132 international seminars with students from partner universities
- 313 awards to students for their participation in seminars with works selected by ad hoc committees
- 38 international concerts with the contribution of young students of Italian foreign music academies
- restoration of 28 masterpieces paintings, sculptures and manuscripts nowadays showed at Uffizi Gallery, Palatina Gallery, San Miniato al Monte Church and in Florence State Archive
- archaeological excavation the Roman villa in Somma Vesuviana near Pompei, in cooperation with the University of Tokyo
- 20 calls for international students
- a program of scholarships for semesters long internships
- 48 exhibitions organized, promoted or supported by the Foundation, in collaboration with local and foreign cultural institutions and academies
- 84 meetings (conferences, seminars, roundtables) organized, promoted or supported by the Foundation
- publications of scientific works, books and conference proceedings

== Cultural heritage ==
In 2000, in Kraków, the Foundation developed its Manifesto. At the same time the Foundation was invited to present its activities at the Conference "Cultural Heritage in the 21st Century - Opportunities and Threats"”. The conference was the starting point of the Foundation's contacts with ICCROM, with the International Council on Monuments and Sites, ICOMOS and in particular with the ICOMOS international Committee Theory and Philosophy of Conservation and Restoration, headed by Andrzej Tomaszewski. For the activities in the field of conservation of cultural heritage, the Foundation received many national and international recognition.

== Restorations promoted ==
The Foundation promoted the restoration of many masterpieces, among which

- Giovanni Bellini (1425-1516) “Sacred allegory” - oil on canvas - Uffizi Gallery
- Léopold Pollak (1806–1880) “Self portrait” - oil on canvas - Uffizi Gallery
- North Italian artist influenced by Dosso Dossi (active during the 16th century) “Portrait of a man” - oil on canvas - Uffizi Gallery
- Gian Paolo Pace (1528–1560) “Portrait of Giovanni dalle Bande Nere” oil on canvas - Uffizi Gallery
- Giovan Battista Moroni (1520–1578) “Portrait of a learned man” oil on canvas - Uffizi Gallery
- Bernardino Campi (1521–1591) “Virile portrait” oil on canvas - Uffizi Gallery
- Alessandro Allori (1535–1607) “Pietà” oil on canvas - Uffizi Gallery
- Giovan Battista Moroni (1520–1578) “Portrait of Giovanni Antonio Pantera” oil on canvas - Uffizi Gallery
- Giulio Campi (1507–1573) “Musicant portrait” oil on canvas - Uffizi Gallery
- Domenico Cresti (1559–1636) “St Luke paints the Virgin” oil on canvas - Uffizi Gallery
- Tiziano Vecellio (1533) “Portrait of Cardinal Ippolito de’ Medici in Hungarian costume” oil on canvas - Palatine Gallery
- Francesco Morandini, Il Poppi (1533) “Cristo e la Emorroissa” oil on canvas - Church of St. Bartolomeo a Monte Oliveto (restoration of the wooden frame)
- Unknown artist of the Florentine School (17th century) “Last supper” - oil on canvas - Church of San Miniato al Monte in Florence
- Unknown artist of the Florentine School (17th century) “Bishop Saint” - oil on canvas - Church of San Miniato al Monte in Florence
- Unknown artist of the Florentine School (17th century) “Painting concerning Benedictine scenes” - oil on canvas - Church of San Miniato al Monte in Florence
- Unknown artist of the Florentine School (17th century) “Painting concerning Benedictine scenes” - oil on canvas - Church of San Miniato al Monte in Florence
- Unknown artist of the Florentine School (17th century) “Dream of St. Joseph” - oil on canvas - Church of San Miniato al Monte in Florence
- Jacopo del Casentino (1297–1358) “San Miniato and scene of his life” - tempera on panel - Church of San Miniato al Monte in Florence
- Giovanni Antonio Bazzi, called Sodoma (Vercelli 1477-Siena 1549) “Saint Sebastian” oil on canvas - Uffizi Gallery (under restoration)
- Giovanni Antonio Bazzi, called Sodoma (Vercelli 1477-Siena 1549) the” Madonna with the Child and Saints Rocco and Sigismond with six Brothers”. oil on canvas - Uffizi Gallery (under restoration)
- “Casa di Dante Museum” - contribution to the reopening of the museum
- Memorial monument of Cneus Sentius Felix (beginning II century A.C.) - Uffizi Gallery
- Memorial monumento of Dionysus Skianthi (I century A.C.) - Uffizi Gallery
- Contribution to the reopening of an archaeological site of an ancient Roman villa in Somma Vesuviana (near Pompei), with the co-operation of the Tokyo University, the University Federico II of Neaples and the University Suor Orsola Benincasa of Neaples
- Archivistic document “Notarile Antecosimiano” at the State Archive of Florence
- Archivistic document “Ospedale di Santa Maria Nuova” at the State Archive of Florence
- Archivistic document “Camera d’Arme 35” at the State Archive of Florence
- Restoration of the painting “Arhat” by the Chinese artist Min Zhen (1730-?) in co-operation with the Chinese Art Museum of Parma

== Life Beyond Tourism ==
In March 2008, the Foundation launched a new orientation called Life Beyond Tourism, with the aim of bringing together the tourist experience with the knowledge and appreciation of cultural diversity. The aim is to stimulate the attention of tourists, who spreads with their journey and their experience, the knowledge and the cultural heritage of the places visited.

== Main awards and acknowledgements ==
- 2010, May 25, Moscow (Russia), honorary doctoral degree to Paolo Del Bianco, Moscow Architectural Institute (Rector Dmitry Shvidkovsky)
- 2010, June 16, Tbilisi (Georgia), “Golden Lion” to Paolo del Bianco by President Mikhail Saakashvili
- 2010, April 21, honorary doctoral degree to Paolo Del Bianco, Tbilisi State University (Rector Giorgi Khubua)
- 2007, September 20, Kraków, (Poland), Medal Honoris Gratia to the Romualdo Del Bianco Foundation by the municipality of Kraków, mayor Jacek Majchrowski
- 2007, May 11–12, Green Bay, Wisconsin (USA), honorary doctoral degree in Human Letters to Paolo Del Bianco in recognition of the extraordinary humanitarian work of the Foundation
- 2006, November 29, Florence (Italy), “Il Gonfalone d’Argento” to the Foundation by Tuscany Regional Council for the role of the Romualdo Del Bianco Foundation in “promoting the protection and conservation of the cultural and artistic heritage, not only in our Region, but at international level as well”
- 2006, September 25, Ivanovo (Russia), degree of honorary professor to Paolo Del Bianco, Ivanovo State University (Rector Vladimir Egorov)
- 2004, Novembre 13, Florence (Italy), International prize “Amerigo Vespucci – Ideal ambassador of Florence city” by Mayor Leonardo Domenici and Counsellor for International Relationships and Twinning, Eugenio Giani
- 2002, March 2, Ordre du merite culturel by the Polish Ministry of Culture, on behalf of the Polish Government, to Paolo Del Bianco “en reconnaissance du precieux apport à la diffusion de la culture polonaise”, n° 565/2002 Varsovie 14.02.2002 (Florence, Italy)

== See also ==
- Interculturalism
- Paolo Del Bianco
- Life Beyond Tourism
- Andrzej Tomaszewski
- ICOMOS
