= Felicja Curyłowa =

Polish folk artist

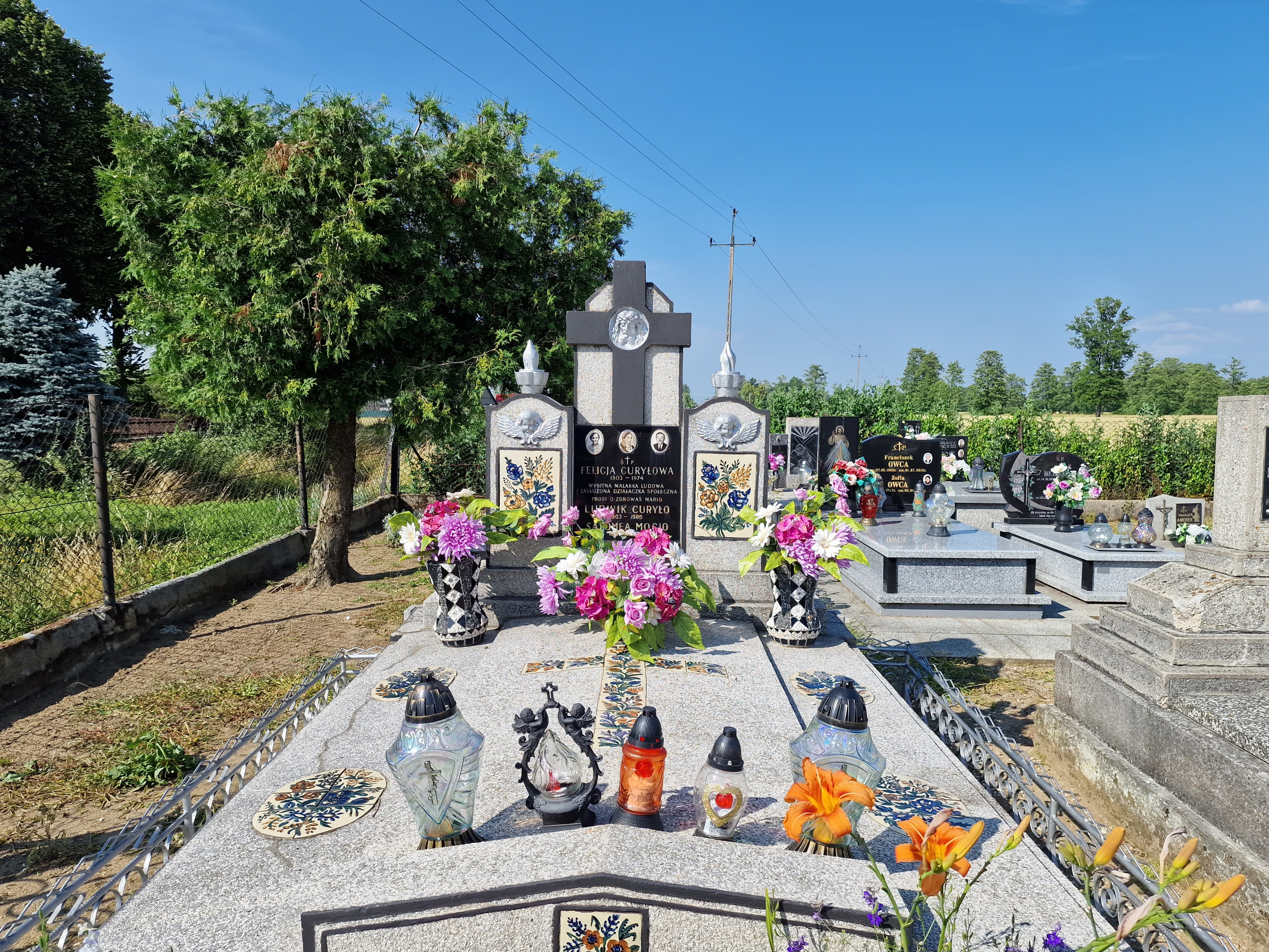
- Born: 1904; Zalipie, Poland
- Died: 1974 (aged 69–70)
- Known for: folk art

Felicja Curyłowa (1904–1974) was a Polish folk artist. After her death, because she was the best-known painter of the local tradition of "painted cottages" (Malowana Chata), her former home was opened to the public as an open-air museum.

== Biography ==
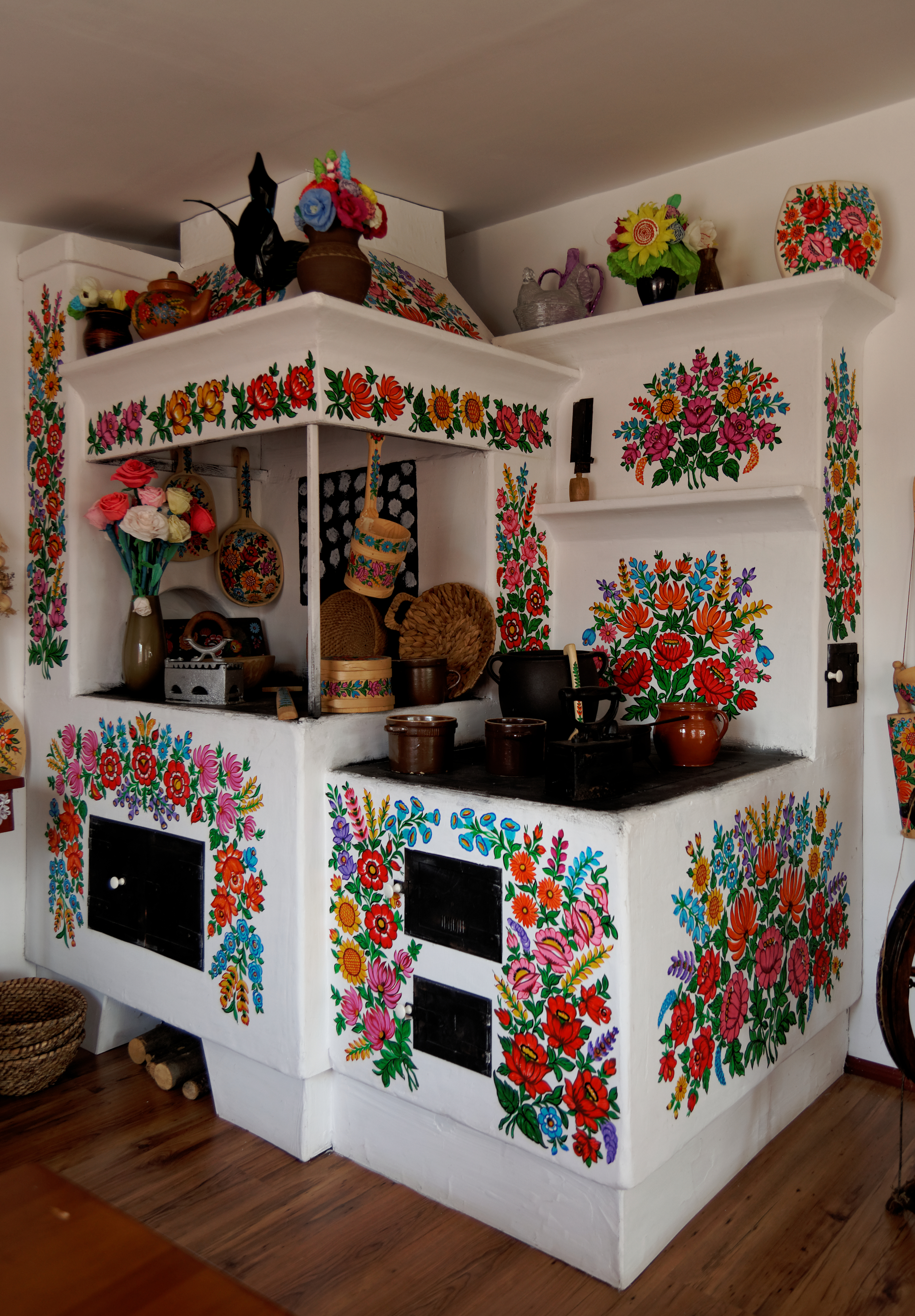
One of her cottage interiors

Born in Zalipie in 1904, Curyłowa painted every available surface in her home with floral ornamental painting. She painted directly on the plaster, on paper, carpet, and utilized cut-outs. She also created traditional cloths and items made of tissue paper. Besides painting, she also practised various decorative crafts. Curyłowa was also asked to paint the interior of the Wierzynek restaurant in Kraków and the dining room on the MS Batory cruise ship. Her designs were reproduced commercially as decorations on china.

== Death and legacy ==
In 1978, after her death, her farmhouse was converted into a museum as a part of the District Museum in Tarnów.
