= Paolo Del Bianco =

Italian architect (born 1945)

- Born: August 2, 1945 (age 81); Florence, Italy
- Education: University of Florence
- Occupation: Emeritus President of the Romualdo Del Bianco Foundation
- Parent: Romualdo Del Bianco (father)

Paolo Del Bianco (born August 2, 1945), is Emeritus President of the Fondazione Romualdo Del Bianco , member of the ICOMOS Hungary Committee, member of the ICOMOS International Scientific Committee for Theory and Philosophy of Conservation and Restoration, honorary member of the ICOMOS International Scientific Committee for Mural Paintings, promoter and founder of Life Beyond Tourism philosophy and Founder of the Museum of the Sacredness of Expressions of Gratitude (Museo della Sacralità delle Espressioni di Gratitudine) in Palazzo Coppini, Florence. Paolo Del Bianco is author of the Artwork Stupore (WONDER) a bronze sculpture that embodies the Life Beyond Tourism® philosophy and explains through Art the message of the Heritage for Building Peace Appeal - 2025.

== Current positions ==
Fondazione Romualdo Del Bianco-Life Beyond Tourism	Founder and Emeritus President
ICOMOS Hungary	Member
ICOMOS Theophilos	Member
ICOMOS Mural Paintings	Honorary Member
Centro Congressi Auditorium al Duomo in Florence	President
Life Beyond Tourism srl start up for social purpose	President of the Board
MAAM (International Academy of Architecture, Moscow)	Professor
Forum UNESCO – University and Heritage	Member
Institute Life Beyond Tourism	President
Accademia delle Arti del Disegno di Firenze	Honorary Member
Antica Compagnia del Paiolo di Firenze	Honorary Member

== Biography ==
Born in Florence, Italy, Paolo Del Bianco graduated at the University of Florence in 1972 with a degree in architecture. In the period 1972–1975 he was assistant professor at the Faculty of Architecture at the University of Florence. He then focused on building construction for the hotel industry. He designed and built hotels and a conference center in Florence, later overseeing their management.

In 1998 he founded the Romualdo Del Bianco Foundation.

In the period 2002–2006 Del Bianco was appointed Associate Professor of the Department of Architecture at the Slovak Technical University of Bratislava (Slovakia).

== Biography note ==
Since 2014	Honorary Professor of Kazak Leading Academy of Architecture and Construction (Kazakhstan)
	Honorary Professor of Samara State University of Architecture and Civil Engineering (Russia)
Since 2013	Emeritus Professor at Ivanovo State University (Russia)
	Laurea Honoris Causa from the Kyrgyz Russian Slavic University (Kyrgyzstan)
	Doctor Honoris Causa from Ivane Javakhishvili Tbilisi State University (Georgia)
Since 2011	Professor MAAM (International Academy of Architecture, Moscow)
Since 2010	Laurea Honoris Causa from Tbilisi State University (Georgia)
	Degree of Honoris Causa from Tbilisi State Academy of Arts (Georgia)
	Laurea Honoris Causa from the Moscow Architectural Institute-MARHI (Russia)
	Profano Honoris Causa from the Odesa State Academy of Architecture and Construction (Ukraine)
Since 2009	Honorary Doctor of the Azerbaijan State University (Azerbaijan)
Since 2008	Doctor of the Yerevan State University (Armenia)
Since 2007	Doctor of Human Letters at the University of Wisconsin Green Bay (USA)
Since 2006	Honorary Professor of the Ivanovo State University (Russia)
Since 2005	Honorary Member of the Union of Architects of Belarus
Since 2004	Honorary Professor of the Kharkiv State Technical University of Architecture and Construction
Since 2003	Honorary Professor of the Institutes of Higher Building Education Association of Moscow
From 2002 till 2006	Associate Professor of the Faculty of Architecture of the Slovak Technical University
1972-7	Assistant professor at University of Florence, Faculty of Architecture
1972	Graduated MA at the University of Florence, Faculty of Architecture

== Awards ==
- 1999 Golden medal certified n. 101 from Tadeusz Kościuszko Cracow University of Technology, Poland
- Bronze Medal "Sztuki Piękne Wilno 1797 - 200 lat tradycji wileńskiej" from the Rector of the University of Toruń prof. Romuald Drzewiecki
- 2000 the Honorary Sign and Membership of the Senate of the Tadeusz Kościuszko Cracow University of Technology
- 2002 Badge of Honour „Meritorious for the Polish Culture” from the Minister of Culture of the Republic of Poland
- 2004 "Premio Amerigo Vespucci – Ambasciatore ideale della città di Firenze" (Florence, Italy)
- 2007 "Il Gonfalone d'Argento" form the Tuscan Region (Italy)
- "Freedom of the Town of Green Bay, Wisconsin" (USA)
- Decoration "Honoris Gratiaa" from the President of Kraków (Poland)
- Medal of Honour by the Foundation Sheremyetev (Paris, France) for "the important contribution to the promotion of friendship and cooperation between Italy and Russia"
- 2008 Honour "Printer Ivan Fedorov Foundation", by the Foundation Printer Ivan Fedorov Moscow (Russia), for "the important contribution to the promotion of friendship and cooperation between Italy and Russia"
- 2009 Medal of recognition by the McKenzie Presbyterian University of São Paulo (Brazil)
- 2010 Honorary Certificate from MOOSAO (Russia) Honorary Citizenship of Tbilisi (Georgia)
- 2012 Medal of Merit by the Academic Senate of the Nicolaus Copernicus University of Toruń (Poland)
- 2013 "Jan Zachwatowicz Award" "for outstanding achievements in research and conservation of monuments" (Poland)
- "Columbus Prize", Section Culture (Italy)
- Certificate of Appreciation from the Ivanovo City (Russia) "Award Aleksej Komech" for the co-operation in the promotion of the Russian cultural heritage
- "National Heritage Award" of the Ministry of Culture and Tourism of the Azerbaijan Republic
- 2014 Award "Casa Martelli" Florence (Italy) Honorary Game Ball of the Green Bay Packers - NFL
- 2015 Silver Gloria Artis Medal for Merit to Culture, by the deputy Minister of Culture and National Heritage of Poland, Piotr Żuchowski
- Medaglia Laurenziana by the Accademia Internazionale Medicea
- Medal celebrating the 100th Anniversary of the Warsaw Technical University, Poland
- 2016 Commemorative medal for the 70th Anniversary of the Cracow University of Technology and the Faculty of Architecture

== Publications ==
- HERITAGE for PLANET EARTH-From World HERITAGE Sites for DIALOGUE, to the PLANET EARTH we all share-"Smart Travel, Smart Architecture, Heritage and its Enjoyment for Dialogue" (Florence, 11–13 March 2017), contribution to the Congress HERITAGE for PLANET EARTH® 2017 –
- Il Modello Life Beyond Tourism®, Sites for Dialogue – Heritage for the Planet©, in "HERITY Wizard's Days-Hypertrophic Tourism" (Venezia, 11 novembre 2016) ISBN 978-88-903829-5-6; pagg. 56-59;
- Il valore del dialogo per la pace: una testimonianza concreta in Quaderni della Fondazione Ernesto Balducci, Quadrimestrale n.32 - 2016 Immigrazione e politiche di espropriazione ambientale, pagg. 69-78;
- World Heritage Sites for Dialogue – Heritage for Intercultural Dialogue, through Travel – Life Beyond Tourism – Conclusion of the 18th International Assembly of the Experts of the Foundation (Florence, 12–13 March 2016) - Masso Delle Fate Edizioni, Firenze, 2016, ISBN 978-88-6039-383-8
- Learning Communities for Intercultural Dialogue for Territorial Development – A New Commercial and Educational Offer 'Culture for Dialogue' – 'Travel for Dialogue' Life, Beyond Tourism – publication for the 18th International Assembly of the Experts of the Fondazione Romualdo Del Bianco 2015 Annual Report and Perspectives – Masso delle Fate Edizioni, Firenze – ISBN 978-88-6039-375-3;
- Learning Communities for Intercultural Dialogue for Territorial Development – A New Commercial and Educational Offer 'Culture for Dialogue' – 'Travel for Dialogue' Life, Beyond Tourism – Slides Book – Masso delle Fate Edizioni, Firenze – ISBN 978-88-6039-376-0;
- Il motivo della dedica della Sala dell'Auditorium al Duomo a Giuliano Borselli, in "Giuliano Borselli, l'arte dell'amicizia, l'orgoglio della fiorentinità" – Masso delle Fate Edizioni ISBN 978-88-6039-374-6, pagg. 9-12:
- Viaggio, Incontro, Ascolto. Ospitalità Tradizionale, Masso delle Fate Edizioni, ISBN 978-88-6039-373-9;
- Cultural values for intercultural dialogue in an economy-driven world in " How to assess build heritage? Assumptions, methodologies, examples of heritage assessment systems", by the International Scientific Committee for Theory and Philosophy of Conservation and Restoration ICOMOS, Romualdo Del Bianco Foundation, Lublin Technical University – Florence-Lublin 2015 - Collection: Heritage for Future, ISBN 978-83-940280-3-9, pagg. 129-138
- Per il Dialogo tra Culture Un Contributo alla Conoscenza della Diversità delle Espressioni Culturali, Carnevali nel Mondo, prefazione agli Atti del Simposio Internazionale Dialogue Among Cultures. Carnivals in the World, edA Esempi di Architettura 2016 Special Issue, Ermes Edizioni -Scientifiche, pagg. 7-8
- Uscire dal Mondo in Francesco d'Assisi. Padre Ernesto Balducci e la profezia della testimonianza; pagg. 44-56 – Polistampa, Firenze 2015
- Heritage for Intercultural Dialogue, a New Commercial Offer for the Tourism Market with Life Beyond Tourism, proceedings of the 2nd Congress of Polish Conservators "The Past for the Future", Kraków, October 2015;
- Life Beyond Tourism. Heritage for Intercultural Dialogue. Hosting the traveller to promote intercultural dialogue by Paolo Del Bianco, paper presented in the scientific conference "Heritage in Transformation. Heritage Protection in the 21st Century, Problems, Challenges, Predictions" celebrating the 50th Anniversary of ICOMOS, Warsaw, June 2015
- Travel and Hospitality for Intercultural Dialogue – the non profit tourism "LBT Model", 2014 Annual Report and Perspectives for the 17th International Assembly of the Experts of the Fondazione Romualdo Del Bianco – March 2015
- Life Beyond Tourism-travel for dialogue with heritage for sustainable development – Greetings and thanks by Paolo Del Bianco, Booklet in DVD "Florence 2000 years of history", 18 ICOMOS General Assembly - ISBN 978-88-404-0043-3 - November 2014
- Heritage for Intercultural Dialogue. The Philosophy, the Life Beyond Tourism (LBT) Model and Certified Travel, by Paolo Del Bianco, paper presented during the Scientific Symposium of the 18th General Assembly of ICOMOS "Heritage and Landscape as Human Values" – November 2014
- Florence in the works of world famous people – Encyclopedic Associative Dictionary for guides and tourists - Greetings and thanks by Paolo Del Bianco – 6th edition pag. 5-7 – September 2014
- Il portale no profit Life Beyond Tourism:patrimonio e cultura contemporanea al servizio del dialogo interculturale e dello sviluppo del territorio, di Carlotta Del Bianco, in "Sharing Conservation", del 05/06/2014, p. 204 - 2014
- Life Beyond Tourism®- In viaggio per il dialogo, in Domes and Cupolas - vol.1 – N.2-2014 - - Angelo Pontecorboli Editore ISSN 2282-6793;
- Life Beyond Tourism - In viaggio per il Dialogo Vol I/1, Tipografia Tipolito Pochini ISBN 978-88-404-0421-9 - March 2014
- Firenze - Life Beyond Tourism - In Viaggio per il Dialogo Vol I/2, Tipografia Tipolito Pochini ISBN 978-88-404-0422-6 – March 2014
- L'Arte e il Patrimonio dell'Umanità per il Dialogo fra Culture, in Padre Ernesto Balducci from the "Artists Mass" to Contemporary Art
- Life Beyond Tourism Non Profit Portal and Cultural Community, in The League of Historical Cities Bulletin No. 64, March 2013
- Cultural Heritage for Intercultural Dialogue with Life Beyond Tourism® in Multi-disciplinary Lexicography: Traditions and Challenges of the XXIst Century Edited by Olga M. Karpova and Faina I. Kartashkova (Cambridge Scholars Published, 2013), pp. 246–255
- Incontri, Comunicazione, Conoscenza, Conservazione, Economia. Una piattaforma virtuale per scambi fra teoria e pratica: Portale Non Profit Life Beyond Tourism / Encounters, Communication, Knowledge, Conservation, Economy. A virtual platform for an osmosis between theory and practice Life Beyond Tourism: Non-profit Portal, in Conservation Turn - Return To Conservation Tolerance for Change Limits of Change ICOMOS, International Scientific Committee for the Theory and the Philosophy of Conservation and Restoration, (5–9 May 2010, Prague/Český Krumlov, Czech Republic 3–6 March 2011, Florence Italy) ed. by Wilfried Lipp, Josef Stulc, Boguslaw Szmygin, Simone Giometti, Firenze 2012, pp 129–134, Foreword, Ivi, pp. 7–9
- Life Beyond Tourism: Value Based Heritage Tourism as an Instrument for Intercultural Dialogue, in Why Does the Past Matter? Changing Visions, Media and Rationales in the 21st Century, Proceedings of the International Conference (May 4–7, 2011, Amherst MA, University of Massachusetts), University of Massachusetts Amherst MA 2011, p. 4
- Presentazione in Giovanni Martinelli pittore di Montevarchi, Maestro del Seicento fiorentino, Catalogo della mostra (Montevarchi 19 marzo – 19 giugno 2011) a cura di Andrea Baldinotti, Bruno Santi, Riccardo Spinelli, "La Città Degli Uffizi.6" Maschietto, Firenze 2011, p. 14
- Preface, in The Caucasus Georgia on the Crossroads. Cultural Exchanges across the Europe and Beyond, Proceedings of the 2nd International Symposium of Georgian Culture (November 2–9, 2009, Florence, Italy), Georgian Arts and Culture Center, Tbilisi 2011, p. 11
- Caucasian Georgia at the Crossroads: Life Beyond Tourism, Ivi, pp. 185–189
- Per non dimenticare, per consentire di conoscere e per ringraziare in A. Kadluczka, La piazza principale di Cracovia, il museo sotterraneo e il mercato dei tessuti - I progetti di restauro, di modernizzazione e loro realizzazione, 2002-2010, Archeon, Cracovia 2011, pp. 6–10
- Presentazione, in Benozzo Gozzoli e Cosimo Rosselli nelle terre di Castelfiorentino. Pittura devozionale in Valdelsa, Catalogo della mostra (Castelfiorentino, 1 maggio-31 luglio 2011), a cura di Serena Nocentini, Anna Padoa Rizzo, "La Città Degli Uffizi" Maschietto, Firenze 2011, p. 17;
- Presentazione, in Methodical Approach to the Restoration of Hystoric Architecture, ed. Calogero Bellanca, Alinea Editrice, Firenze 2011 p. 13
- Cultural Heritage for Intercultural Dialogue with Life Beyond Tourism®, in Cultural Heritage for Intercultural Dialogue with Life Beyond Tourism, in The Image of Heritage. Changing Perception, Permanent Responsibilities, Proceedings of the International Conference of the ICOMOS. International Scientific Committee for the Theory and the Philosophy of Conservation and Restoration (6–8 March 2009 Florence, Italy), ed. by Andrzej Tomaszewski, Simone Giometti, Polistampa, Firenze 2011, pp. 37; ISBN 978-88-596-0886-8
- Life Beyond Tourism, in La cultura umanistica e tecnica per la conservazione degli edifici storici e monumentali, Bollettino ingegneri, n.1-2, 2010, pp. 4–6 - ISSN 2035-2417
- Presentazione in Beato Angelico a Pontassieve, Dipinti e sculture del Rinascimento Fiorentino, Catalogo della mostra (Pontassieve28 febbraio – 27 giugno 2010) a cura di Ada Labriola, "La Città Degli Uffizi.3" Mandragora, Firenze 2010, p. 12-13
- Presentazione, in Ghirlandaio Una famiglia di pittori del Rinascimento tra Firenze e Scandicci, Catalogo della mostra (Scandicci 21 novembre 2010-1 maggio 2011) a cura di Annamaria Bernacchioni, "La Città Degli Uffizi.5", Polistampa, Firenze 2010, p. 17
- Le Farfalle della Fondazione Romualdo Del Bianco, in Dipingere le farfalle Giove, Mercurio e la virtù di Dosso Dossi: Un elogio dell'otium e della pittura per Alfonso I D'Este, a cura di Vincenzo Farinella, Editore Polistampa, Firenze 2011, pp. 7–10; ISBN 978-88-596-0267-5
- Life Beyond Tourism, in Florence in the Work of European Writers and Artists: Encyclopaedic Dictionary for Guides and Tourists. Project of a Dictionary, ed. by Olga Karpova, Ivanova State University, Ivanovo 2010
- Presentazione, in Arte a Figline. Dal Maestro della Maddalena a Masaccio, Catalogo della mostra (Figline Valdarno 16 ottobre 2010 – 16 gennaio 2011) a cura di Angelo Tartuferi, "La Città Degli Uffizi.4" Polistampa, Firenze 2010, p. 18-19 - ISBN 978-88-596-0832-5
- Presentazione, in L'Oratorio di Santa Caterina all'Antella e i suoi pittori, Catalogo della mostra (Ponte an Ema Bagno a Ripoli 19 settembre – 31 dicembre 2009) a cura di Angelo Tartuferi, "La Città Degli Uffizi.2" Mandragora, Firenze 2009, p. 11 - ISBN 978-88-7461-141-6
- Life Beyond Tourism, in Florence in the Work of European Writers and Artists: Encyclopaedic Dictionary for Guides and Tourists. Project of a Dictionary, ed. by Olga Karpova, Ivanova State University, Ivanovo 2009, p. 6
- Presentazione, in il Cigoli e i suoi amici, colorire naturale e vero, Catalogo della mostra (Figline Valdarno 18 ottobre 2008- 18 gennaio 2009) a cura di Novella Barbolani di Montauto, Miles Chappell, "La Città Degli Uffizi.1" Polistampa, Firenze 2008, p. 11
- Preface, in Conservation and Preservation. Interactions between Theory and Practice In memoriam Alois Riegl (1858 - 1905). Proceedings of the International Conference of the ICOMOS International Scientific Committee for the Theory and the Philosophy of Conservation and Restoration,(23–27 April 2008 Vienna, Austria) ed. by Michael S. Falser, Wilfried Lipp, Andrzej Tomaszewski p. 9-10;
- The 21st century and the historical Islamic city, in XXI Century: Historic Islamic Cities. International Conference (Baku, November 20–21, 2007) Baku 2008, pp. 11–14 - ISSN 1811-6582
- Greetings and Auspices, in Values and Criteria in Heritage Conservation Proceedings of the International Conference of ICOMOS, ICCROM and Fondazione Romualdo Del Bianco, (2–4 March 2007 Florence) Polistampa, Firenze 2008, pp. 11–19 - ISBN 978-88-596-0449-5
- Life Beyond Tourism, in Florence in the Work of European Writers and Artists: Encyclopaedic Dictionary for Guides and Tourists. Project of a Dictionary, ed. by Olga Karpova, Ivanova State University, Ivanovo 2008
- 2006 Cracow - Cultural Heritage in the 21st Century Opportunities and Challenges - Recovery and Restoration of the Values of Socialisation - International Cultural Centre ISBN 978-83-89273-46-8
- Historical Heritage and Cross Cultural Communication, in Interdisciplinary co-operation for the sustainable development of historical cities and protected areas Perspectives of a sound tourism, Proceedings of the 11th International Conference EURO-ECO 2006 (Kraków, 18–19 September 2006), ed. by Alexandra Wagner, Jan Dobrowolski, Hard Publishing Company, Kraków 2006, p. 27
- Premessa, in A Firenze con i viaggiatori e i residenti polacchi / Florencja Polskich podroznikow i mieszkancow / Polish travellers and residents in Florence, a cura di Luca Bernardini,"Travellers", Nardini, Firenze 2005, pp. 7–9

== Private life ==
He is married with Giovanna, father of three adult daughters, two of which are active in the Fondazione.

== Acknowledgements ==
For his activity as President of the Foundation, he received Honorary Doctorate Degrees from the Azerbaijan State University (Azerbaijan), the Yerevan State University (Armenia), the University of Wisconsin Green Bay (United States), the Tbilisi State University (Georgia), the Tbilisi State Academy of Arts (Georgia) and the Moscow Architectural Institute-MARHI (Russia). He also received Honorary Professorships from the Ivanovo State University (Russia), the Kharkiv State Technical University (Ukraine), and the Higher School for Civil Engineering in Moscow (Russia). He is an Honorary Member of the Senate of the Tadeusz Kościuszko Cracow University of Technology(Poland), an Honorary Member of the Union of Architects of Belarus and a Professor of the International Academy of Architecture-Branch of Moscow (MAAM).

He also received the "Ordre du Mérit Culturel" from the Ministry of Culture of the Republic of Poland, the "Gonfalone d'Argento" form the Tuscan Region (Italy), the "Premio Amerigo Vespucci – Ambasciatore ideale della città di Firenze"(Italy), the "Freedom of the Town of Green Bay, Wisconsin" (USA), the Medal 'Honoris Gratiae' from the President of Kraków, Poland, the Honorary Citizenship of Tbilisi (Georgia).
