= Andrzej Tomaszewski =

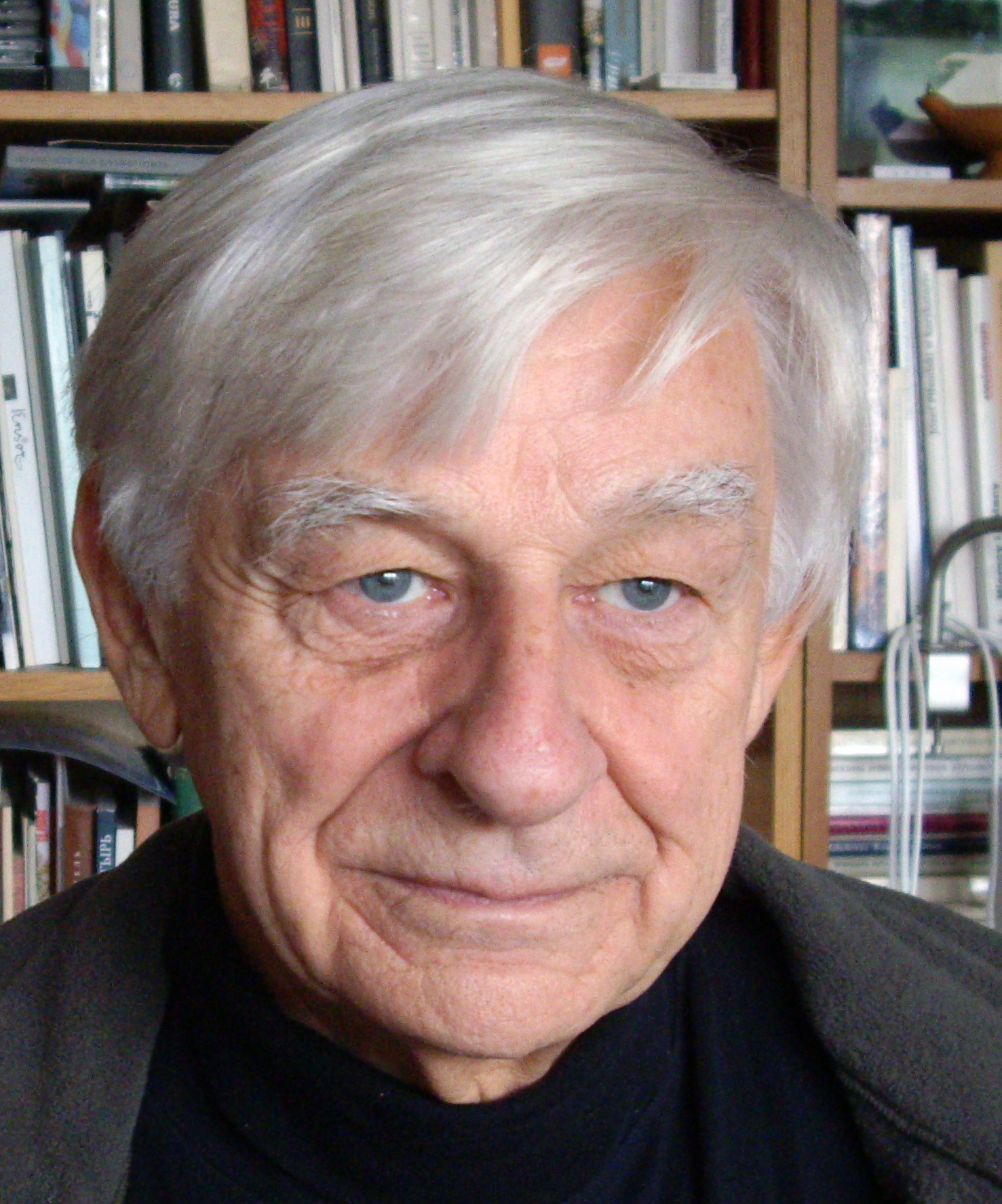
Andrzej Tomaszewski

Andrzej Stanisław Tomaszewski (26 January 1934 – 25 October 2010) was a Polish historian of art and culture, architect, urban planner and archaeologist. He was investigator of medieval architecture and art in Poland and abroad (mainly in Hungary, Belgium and Italy). He was considered one of the most important and influential international scientists in the preservation and conservation of cultural heritage.

== Biography ==
Tomaszewski was born on 26 January 1934 in Warsaw. In 1962 he graduated in Architecture at the Warsaw University of Technology with a dissertation about landscape architecture and preservation of historical sites.

In 1967 he earned his Ph.D. in the History of Architecture and Medieval Archaeology. Soon after he began a research period in Rome, at the Università La Sapienza, under the tutorship of professor Guglielmo de Angelis d'Ossat. During this period, he attended an ICCROM international course on restoration. He obtained his "habilitation" in History of Architecture and Architectonic Restoration in 1976. Throughout his professional career he remained connected with his alma mater, the Warsaw University of Technology, where he was a professor in the Department of Architecture, and Director of the Institute of the History of Architecture and Art.

== Professional activity ==
He expanded the conservation projects at the Collegiate church in Wiślica and the Jan Długosz House, also in Wiślica, the collegiate church in Opatów, and the 12th-century Romanesque church of St. John the Baptist in Prandocin, northeast of Kraków. He also directed the restoration of the cathedral of Saint Lambert in Liège (Belgium), the Middle Ages village of Condorcet (France), the romanesque villa and church in Taliándörögd (Hungary), and the castles in Nicastro and Amendolea Vecchia (Italy).

== Functions ==
As a valued scientific collaborator, he maintained lively contacts with numerous academic centres in Europe. In the years 1988–1992 he was the General Director of ICCROM – the International Centre of Research into the Preservation and Conservation of the Cultural Heritage in Rome.

In 1984–1993 he had relevant functions in ICOMOS as President of the International Committee of Conservators Training. He later was appointed Honorary President of ICOMOS. In 1995–1999 he was General Conservator of the Republic of Poland, directing the State Service for the Protection of Historical Monuments. Through his efforts several important Polish sites were added to the UNESCO World Heritage List, among which are two churches: the Lutheran Church of Peace at Jawor and the Evangelical Church of Peace at Świdnica.

Since 1999 he participated in the activities of the Romualdo Del Bianco Foundation (Florence, Italy) promoting intercultural dialogue between Central-Eastern Europe and Western countries, as President of the Polish Board of Experts of the Foundation. In co-operation with the Foundation he led and chaired the ICOMOS International Scientific Committee for Theory and Philosophy of Conservation and Restoration until his departure. In the period 2003–2009 he was President of the Polish National Committee of ICOMOS.

He was also the Polish delegate to the UNESCO World Heritage Committee and was a member of the Council of Europe’s Committee on Cultural Heritage. He was a member of the International Council of the International Cultural Centre in Kraków, a member of the Scientific Programme Council of Denkmal – The European Trade Fair for Conservation, Restoration and Old Building Renovation in Leipzig. Since 2009 he was a vice-president of PKN ICOMOS and president of the International Council of Museums ICOM.

== Activity in the field of Dialogue Among Cultures ==
For many years he was involved in Polish-German collaboration in the protection and conservation of historical monuments. He initiated the creation of the Working Group of Polish and German Art Historians, and the creation of the German-Polish Foundation for the Preservation of Cultural Monuments. He was member of the Board of International Experts of the Romualdo Del Bianco Foundation in Florence, Italy.

== Publications ==
Tomaszewski completed, in Poland and abroad, more than 300 works and publications of research in medieval architecture, and the theory of preservation and conservation of cultural heritage.

== Honors ==
- 1999 - Honorary citizenship of Bova City (Italy)
- 2002 - Honorary citizenship of Jawor City (Poland)
- 2003 - Georg Dehio Prize(de:Georg-Dehio-Kulturpreis)
- 2010 - Kronenberg Foundation Aleksander Gieysztor Prize
- 2010 - Jan Zachwatowicz Prize
- 2011 - "Anfiteatro Andrzej Tomaszewski" - amphitheater in Florence, Italy, entitled to the memory by the Romualdo Del Bianco Foundation.
