= Zalipie, Lesser Poland Voivodeship =

Zalipie
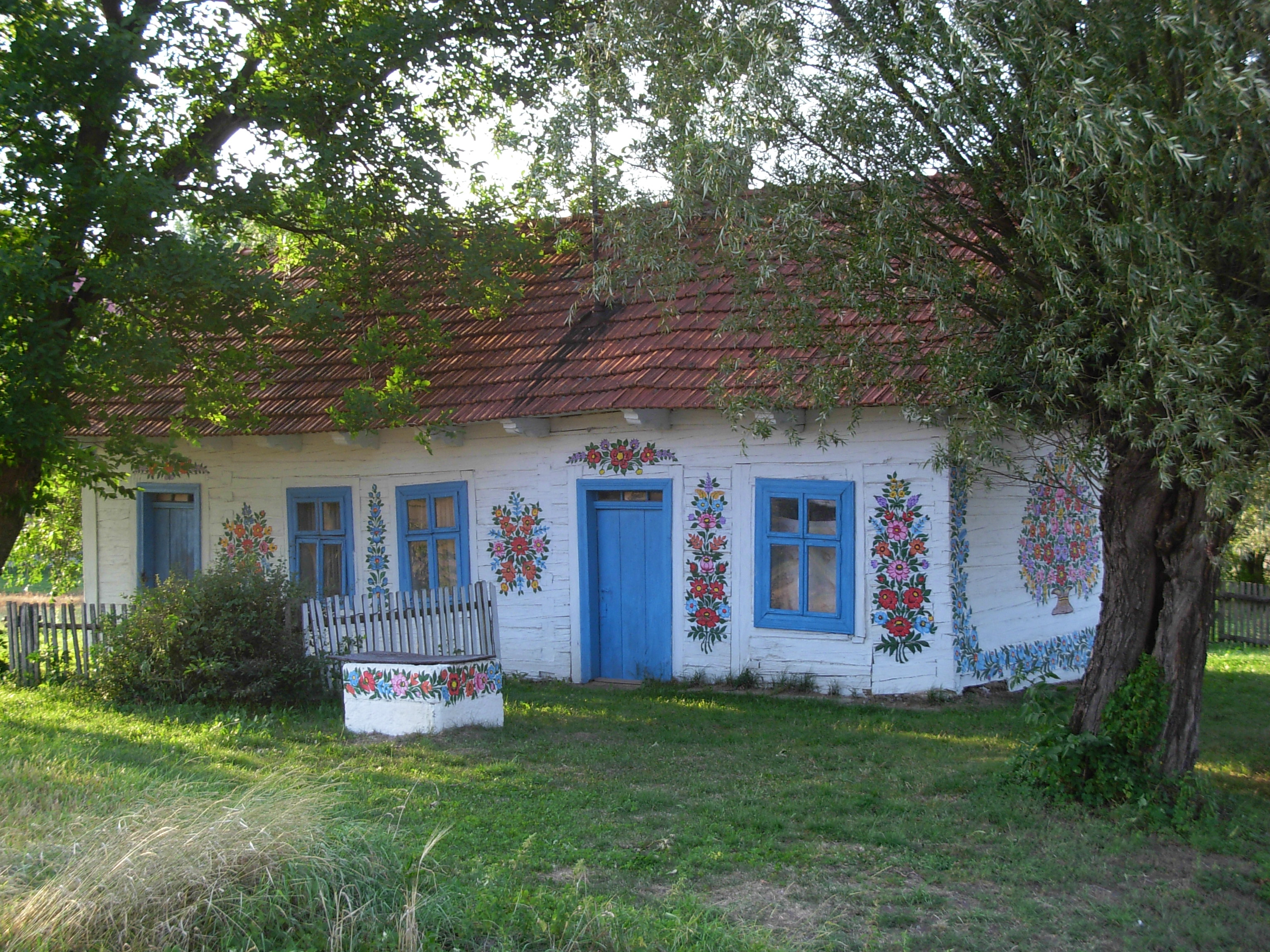
- Painted cottage in Zalipie

- Location within Poland
- Coordinates: 50°15′N 20°51′E
- Country: Poland
- Voivodeship: Lesser Poland
- County: Dąbrowa
- Gmina: Gmina Olesno

Area
  - Total: 8.05 km^{2} (3.11 sq mi)

Population (2004)
  - Total: 743
  - Density: 92.3/km^{2} (239/sq mi)
- Time zone: UTC+1 (CET)
  - Summer (DST): UTC+2 (CEST)
- Postal code: 33-263
- Area code: +48 14
- Car plates: KDA

Zalipie [zaˈlipjɛ] is a small rural village in south-eastern Poland, in Gmina Olesno, Dąbrowa County, Lesser Poland Voivodeship.

It is known for a local custom of painting the cottages with decorative motifs. The former home of local artist Felicja Curyłowa is perhaps one of the best examples of this tradition.

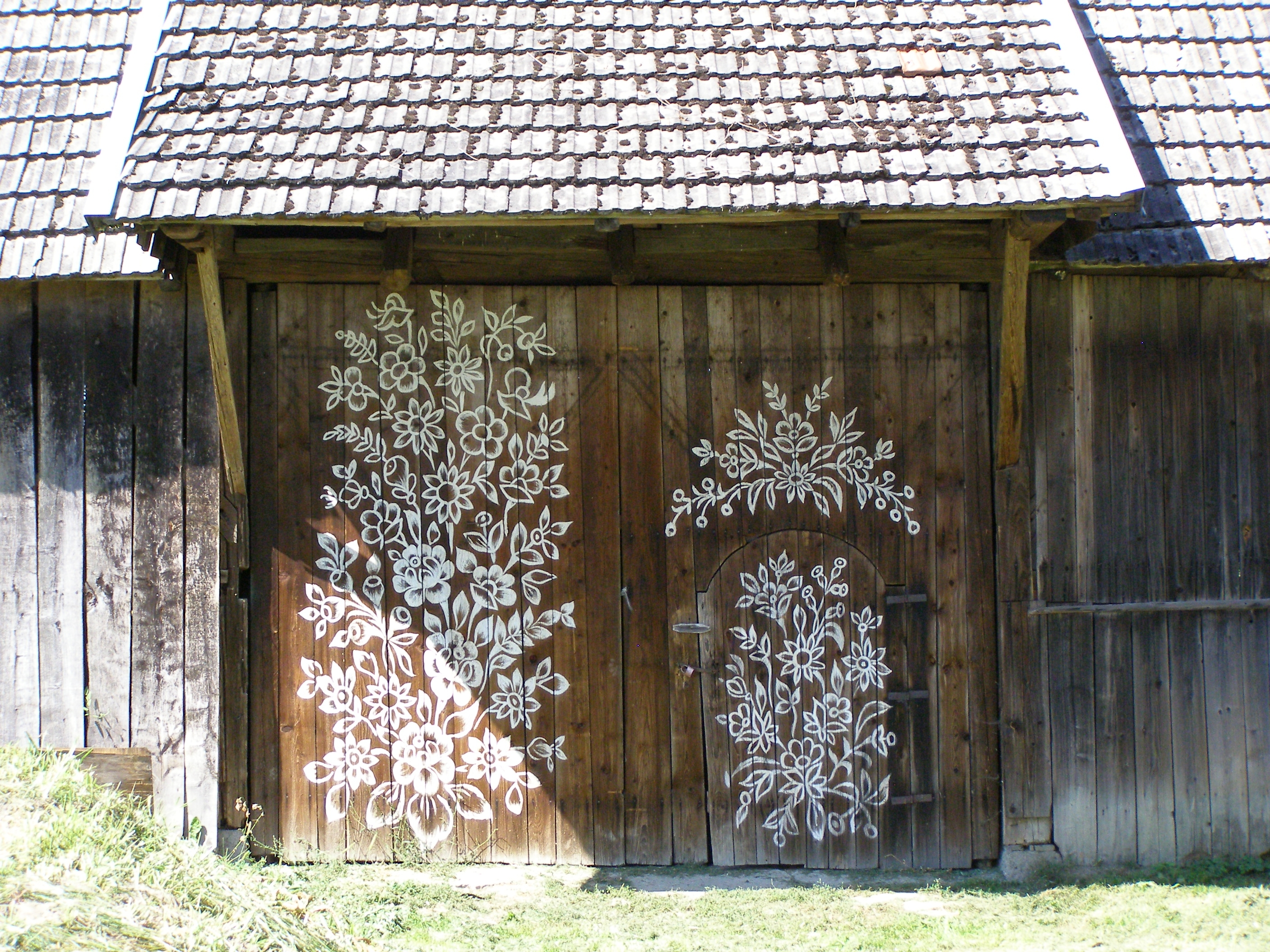

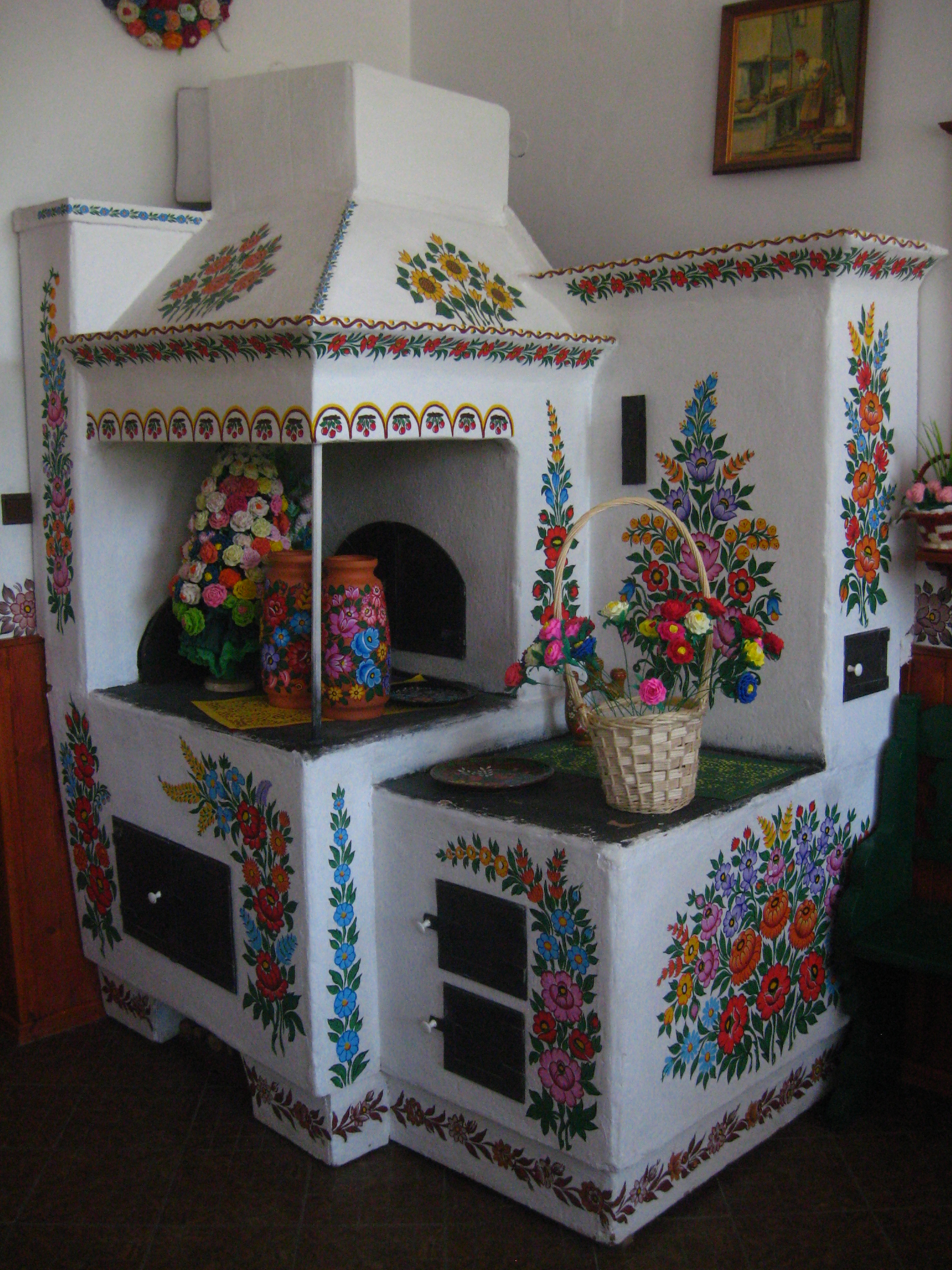

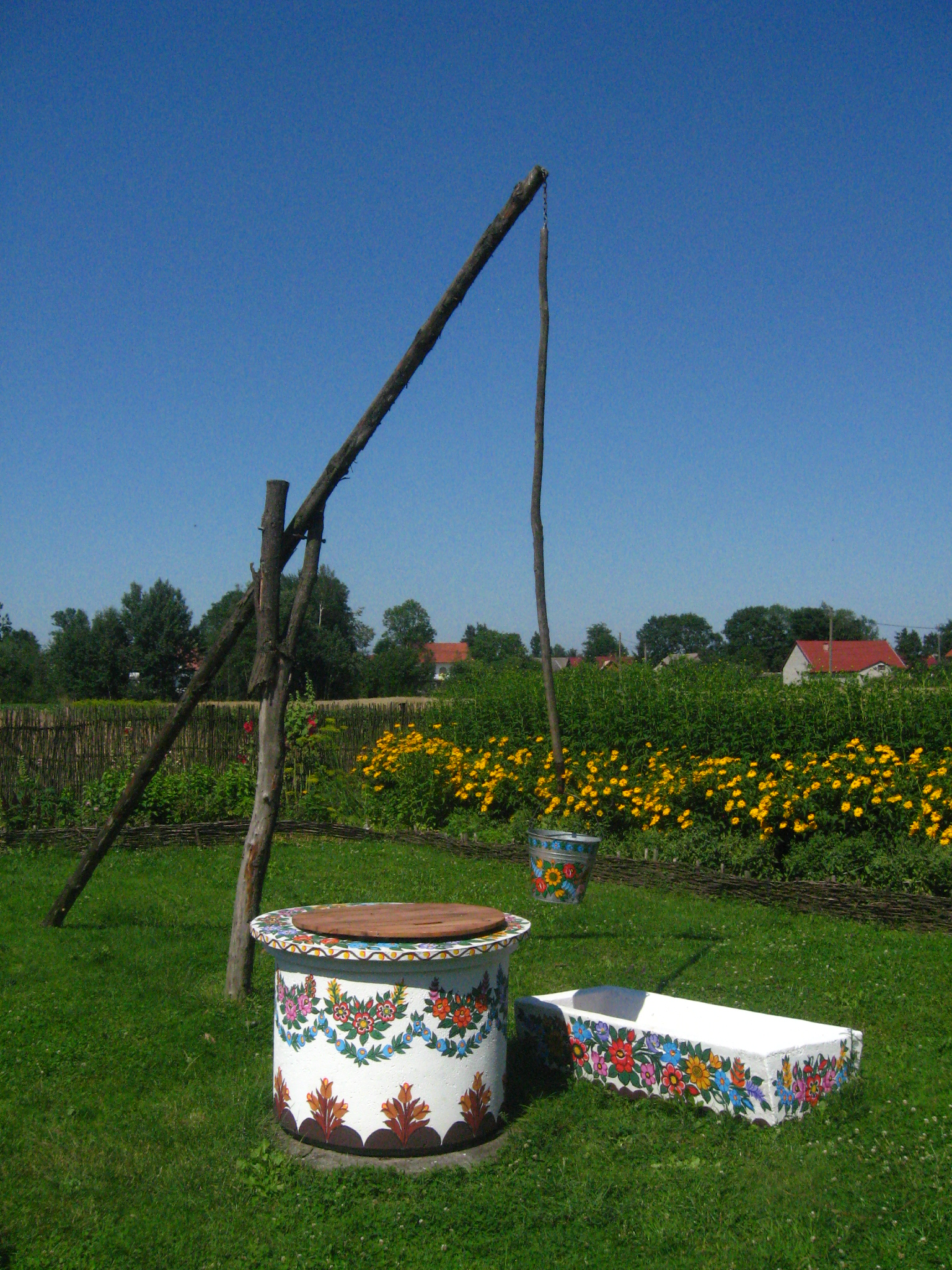

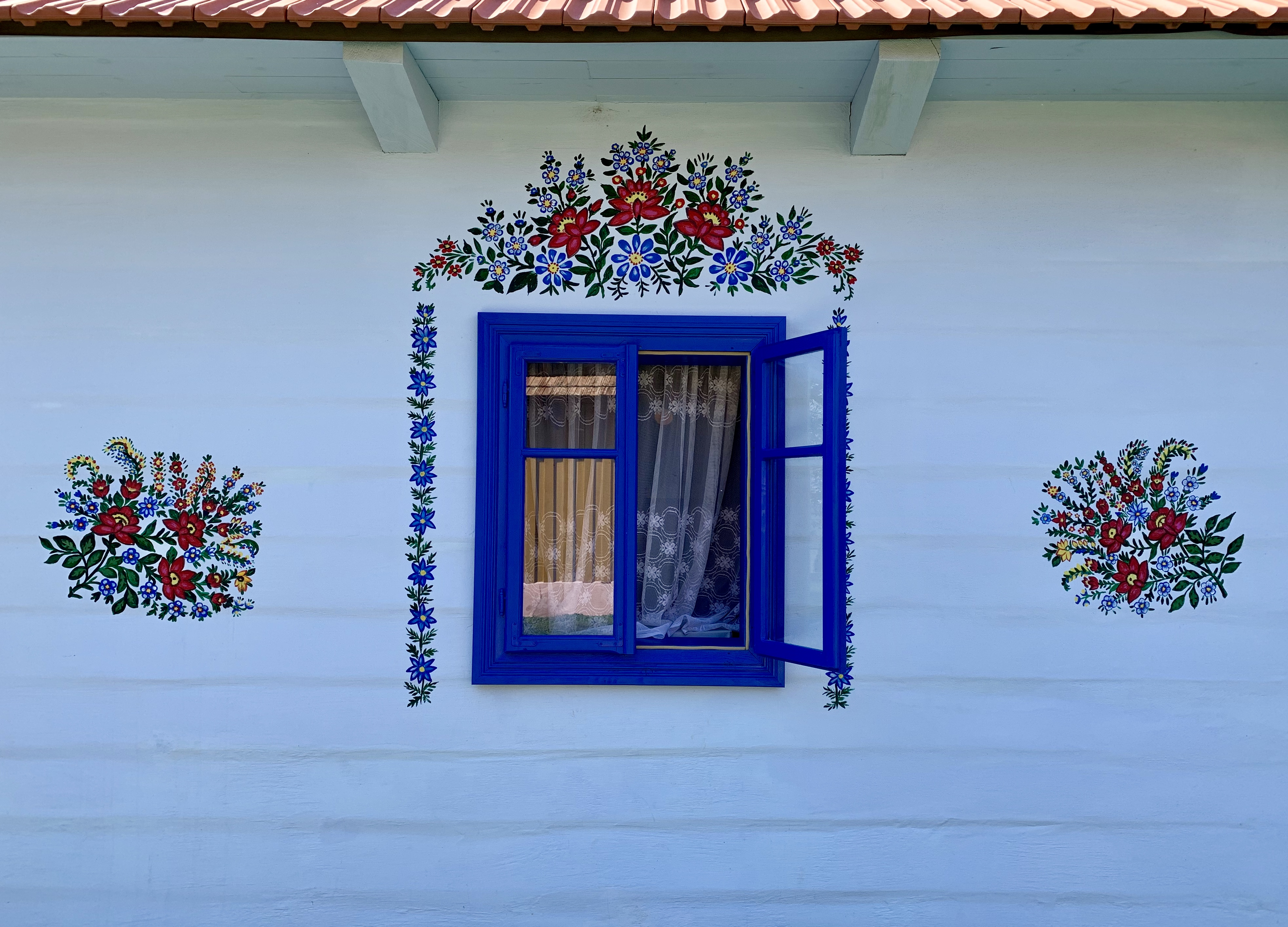
