= Torre dei Rossi-Cerchi =

Reconstructed medieval tower

Coordinates: 43°46′2.94″N 11°15′9.55″E

The Tower or Torre dei Rossi-Cerchi is a reconstructed medieval tower, now part of the B&B Hotel Pitti Palace al Ponte Vecchio, located on Via Guicciardini, corner Borgo San Jacopo, in the Oltrarno district near the entrance to the Ponte Vecchio in Florence, region of Tuscany, Italy.

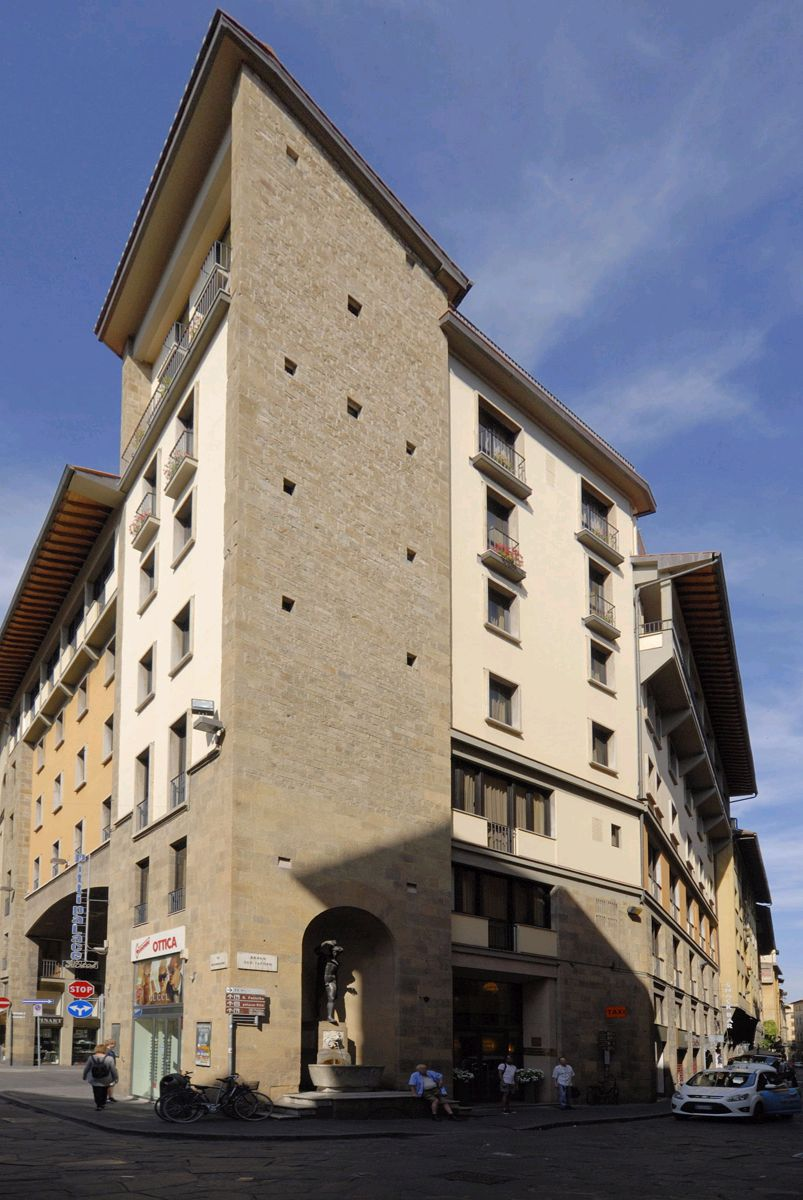
Rebuilt Rossi-Cerchi Tower

== History ==
The present tower is a reconstruction after the prior structure was entirely razed by mining to destroy all the Florentine bridges over the Arno by retreating German forces during World War Two.

The tower was built in the early 1200s by the Guelph Rossi family. The tower and the adjacent house were partially destroyed, after the Ghibelline victory at the Battle of Montaperti and the property was inherited at first by the Cerchi family, and later by the Canigiani family.

The structure is presently part of the B&B Hotel Pitti Palace al Ponte Vecchio.

== Bacchus Fountain ==
A statue of Bacchus is now present in a niche created in the tower. At the site, this statue was previously a fountain with a Roman Sarcophagus, a grouping which had been assembled in 1838. The Sarcophagus was destroyed in the World War. The statue was attributed to Giambologna. The present statue is a copy of the original now kept in the Bargello.

Before the statue of Bacchus, the site had a statue of Centaurus, also by Giambologna, now moved to the Loggia della Signoria.

== Bibliography ==
- AA.VV. eds., Francesco Tiezzi architetto, Torrita di Siena, Ass. Culturale Villa Classica, 2009
- Francesco Vossilla, Storia d’una fontana. Il Bacco del Giambologna in Borgo San Jacopo, Mitteilungen des Kunsthistorischen Institutes in Florenz, 38. Bd., H. 1 (1994), pp. 130–146
- Carlo Cresti, Fontane di Firenze, Florence, 1982
