= Archaeological tourism =

Tourism around buildings and archaeological sites

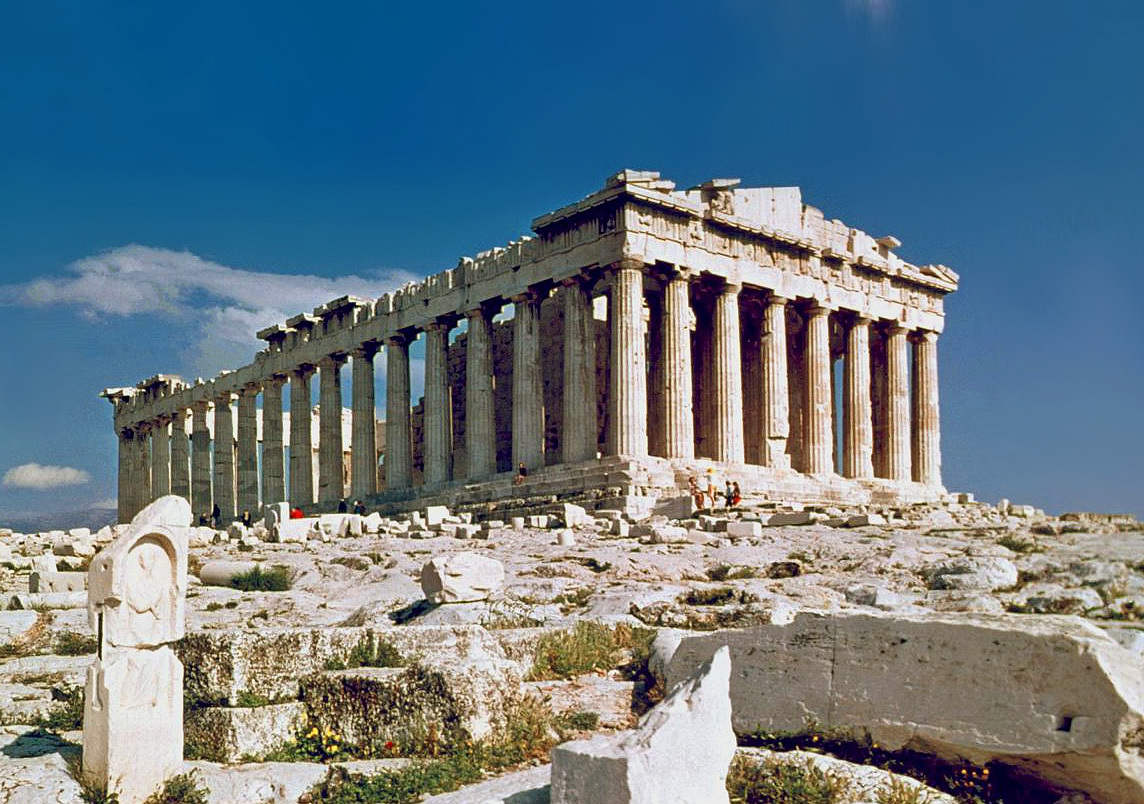
The Parthenon in Athens reached an annual visitorship of three million in 2022.

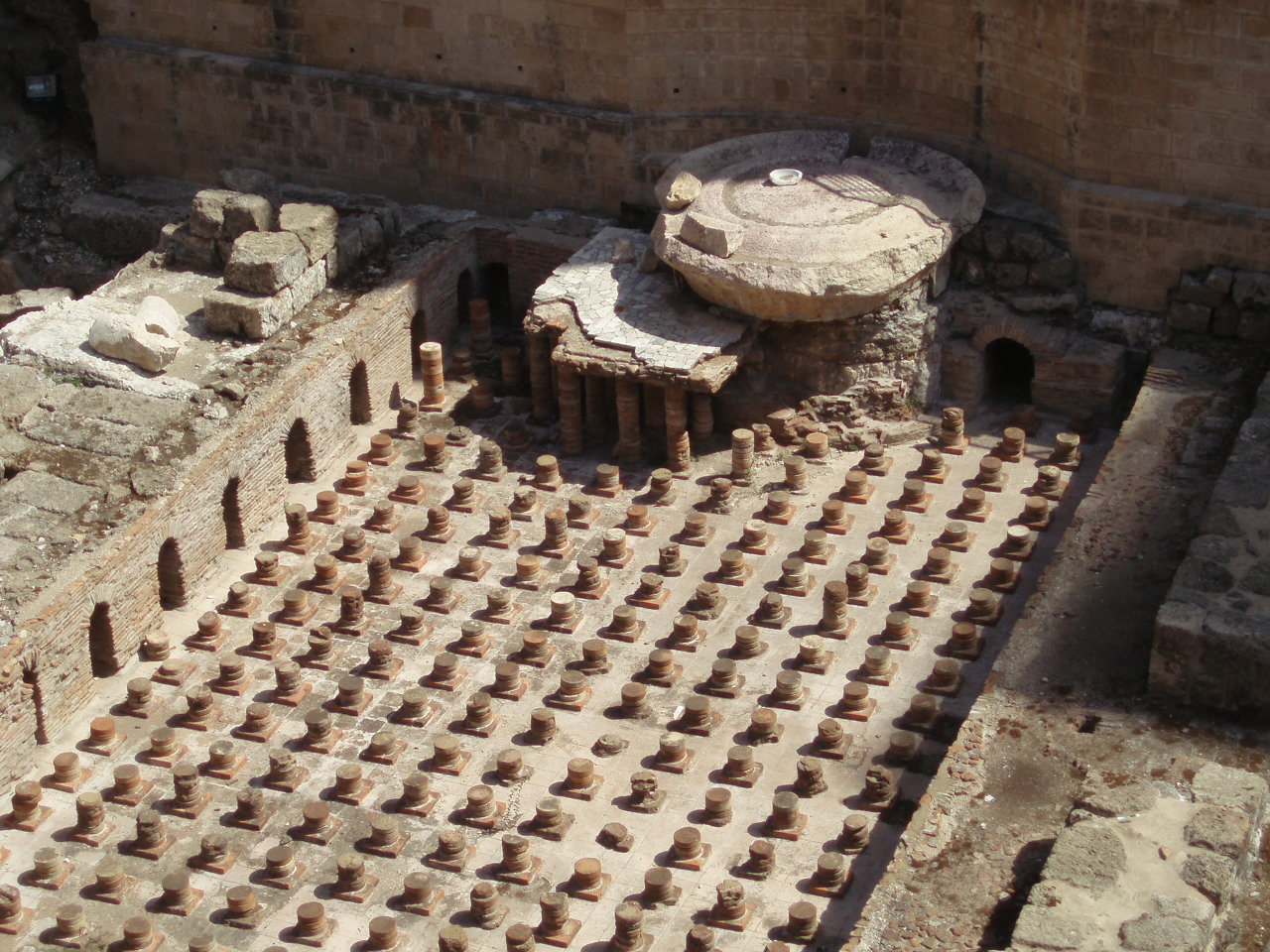
Ruins of an ancient Roman bathhouse in Beirut Central District (Lebanon)

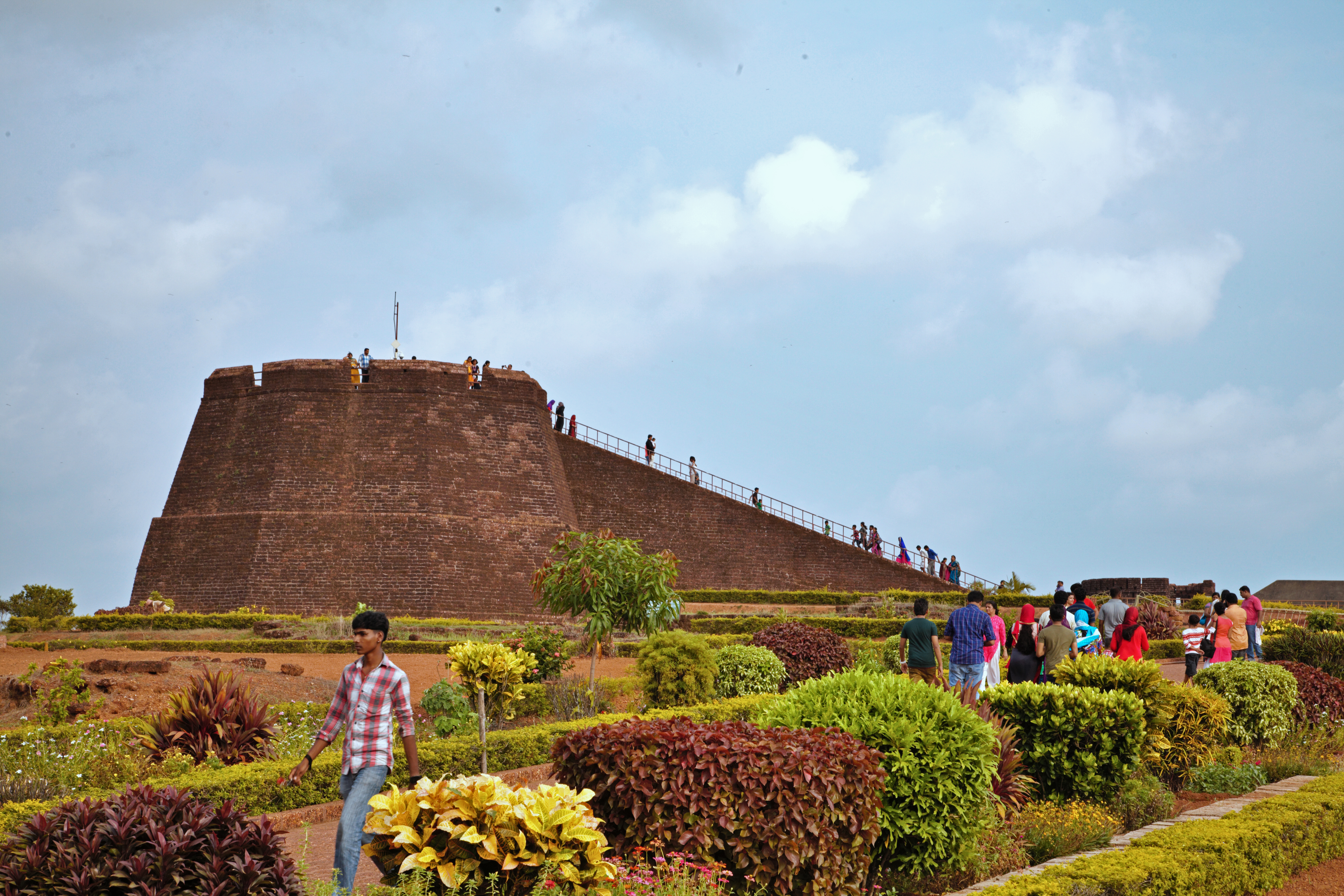
Visitors inside Bekal Fort in Kerala, protected by the Archaeological Survey of India. The gardens inside the fort are made mainly for tourism.

Archaeotourism or Archaeological tourism is a form of cultural tourism, which aims to promote public interest in archaeology while conserving historical sites.

== Activities ==
Archaeological tourism can include all products associated with public archaeological promotion such as: visits to archaeological sites, museums, interpretation centers, reenactments of historical occurrences, and the rediscovery of indigenous products, festivals, or theaters.

== Impact ==
Archaeological tourism promotes archaeological sites and an area's cultural heritage. Its intent is to not cause more damage to the sites, thus avoiding becoming invasive tourism. Archaeologists have expressed concerns that tourism encourages particular ways of seeing and knowing the past. When archaeological sites are run by tourist boards, ticket fees and souvenir revenues can become a priority. The tradeoff between opening a site to the public or remaining closed and keeping the site out of harm's way should be assessed. Damage to irreplaceable archaeological materials is not only direct, as when remains are disordered, altered, destroyed, or looted, but often an indirect result of poorly planned development of tourism amenities, such as hotels, restaurants, roads, and shops. These can alter the environment producing flooding, landslides, or undermining ancient structures.

== Notable sites ==
- In Oman, the Ministry of Heritage and Culture sponsored a project at the village of Imti with artist Maryam Al Zadjali, entitled “To Immortalise the Archaeological Moment in Art.” The project encouraged tourism to the village, through the installation of artistic interventions such as wall-paintings.

== External links sites ==
- ArqueotuR (2010) Institutional network for the promotion of archaeological tourism and local development. Co-ordinated by the University of Barcelona.
- The AIA-ATTA Guide To Best Practices For Archaeological Tourism
